

269001–269100 

|-bgcolor=#d6d6d6
| 269001 ||  || — || March 13, 2007 || Mount Lemmon || Mount Lemmon Survey || — || align=right | 3.5 km || 
|-id=002 bgcolor=#E9E9E9
| 269002 ||  || — || March 13, 2007 || Mount Lemmon || Mount Lemmon Survey || — || align=right | 3.1 km || 
|-id=003 bgcolor=#E9E9E9
| 269003 ||  || — || March 13, 2007 || Mount Lemmon || Mount Lemmon Survey || — || align=right | 2.8 km || 
|-id=004 bgcolor=#E9E9E9
| 269004 ||  || — || March 13, 2007 || Mount Lemmon || Mount Lemmon Survey || — || align=right | 2.1 km || 
|-id=005 bgcolor=#E9E9E9
| 269005 ||  || — || March 13, 2007 || Nyukasa || Mount Nyukasa Stn. || — || align=right | 1.2 km || 
|-id=006 bgcolor=#E9E9E9
| 269006 ||  || — || March 9, 2007 || Mount Lemmon || Mount Lemmon Survey || — || align=right data-sort-value="0.99" | 990 m || 
|-id=007 bgcolor=#E9E9E9
| 269007 ||  || — || March 9, 2007 || Mount Lemmon || Mount Lemmon Survey || — || align=right data-sort-value="0.91" | 910 m || 
|-id=008 bgcolor=#E9E9E9
| 269008 ||  || — || March 10, 2007 || Kitt Peak || Spacewatch || RAF || align=right | 1.1 km || 
|-id=009 bgcolor=#fefefe
| 269009 ||  || — || March 11, 2007 || Kitt Peak || Spacewatch || NYS || align=right data-sort-value="0.92" | 920 m || 
|-id=010 bgcolor=#E9E9E9
| 269010 ||  || — || March 11, 2007 || Kitt Peak || Spacewatch || — || align=right | 2.5 km || 
|-id=011 bgcolor=#fefefe
| 269011 ||  || — || March 12, 2007 || Kitt Peak || Spacewatch || NYS || align=right data-sort-value="0.93" | 930 m || 
|-id=012 bgcolor=#E9E9E9
| 269012 ||  || — || March 13, 2007 || Kitt Peak || Spacewatch || HEN || align=right | 1.5 km || 
|-id=013 bgcolor=#E9E9E9
| 269013 ||  || — || March 14, 2007 || Kitt Peak || Spacewatch || — || align=right | 2.0 km || 
|-id=014 bgcolor=#fefefe
| 269014 ||  || — || March 15, 2007 || Catalina || CSS || — || align=right | 1.1 km || 
|-id=015 bgcolor=#E9E9E9
| 269015 ||  || — || March 10, 2007 || Catalina || CSS || BAR || align=right | 1.6 km || 
|-id=016 bgcolor=#E9E9E9
| 269016 ||  || — || March 14, 2007 || Mount Lemmon || Mount Lemmon Survey || — || align=right | 2.0 km || 
|-id=017 bgcolor=#d6d6d6
| 269017 ||  || — || March 11, 2007 || Kitt Peak || Spacewatch || — || align=right | 4.8 km || 
|-id=018 bgcolor=#E9E9E9
| 269018 ||  || — || March 14, 2007 || Kitt Peak || Spacewatch || — || align=right | 1.9 km || 
|-id=019 bgcolor=#E9E9E9
| 269019 ||  || — || March 15, 2007 || Mount Lemmon || Mount Lemmon Survey || — || align=right | 3.4 km || 
|-id=020 bgcolor=#E9E9E9
| 269020 ||  || — || March 12, 2007 || Kitt Peak || Spacewatch || — || align=right | 1.3 km || 
|-id=021 bgcolor=#E9E9E9
| 269021 ||  || — || March 9, 2007 || Kitt Peak || Spacewatch || — || align=right | 1.6 km || 
|-id=022 bgcolor=#E9E9E9
| 269022 ||  || — || March 10, 2007 || Mount Lemmon || Mount Lemmon Survey || — || align=right | 1.0 km || 
|-id=023 bgcolor=#E9E9E9
| 269023 ||  || — || March 13, 2007 || Mount Lemmon || Mount Lemmon Survey || — || align=right | 1.0 km || 
|-id=024 bgcolor=#E9E9E9
| 269024 ||  || — || March 10, 2007 || Mount Lemmon || Mount Lemmon Survey || WIT || align=right | 1.1 km || 
|-id=025 bgcolor=#E9E9E9
| 269025 ||  || — || March 14, 2007 || Catalina || CSS || — || align=right | 2.4 km || 
|-id=026 bgcolor=#E9E9E9
| 269026 ||  || — || March 16, 2007 || Catalina || CSS || — || align=right | 2.1 km || 
|-id=027 bgcolor=#E9E9E9
| 269027 ||  || — || March 18, 2007 || Kitt Peak || Spacewatch || — || align=right | 1.7 km || 
|-id=028 bgcolor=#E9E9E9
| 269028 ||  || — || March 16, 2007 || Mount Lemmon || Mount Lemmon Survey || JUN || align=right | 1.1 km || 
|-id=029 bgcolor=#E9E9E9
| 269029 ||  || — || March 16, 2007 || Socorro || LINEAR || — || align=right | 2.6 km || 
|-id=030 bgcolor=#E9E9E9
| 269030 ||  || — || March 16, 2007 || Kitt Peak || Spacewatch || — || align=right | 3.2 km || 
|-id=031 bgcolor=#E9E9E9
| 269031 ||  || — || March 16, 2007 || Kitt Peak || Spacewatch || — || align=right | 1.2 km || 
|-id=032 bgcolor=#E9E9E9
| 269032 ||  || — || March 17, 2007 || Anderson Mesa || LONEOS || RAF || align=right | 1.2 km || 
|-id=033 bgcolor=#E9E9E9
| 269033 ||  || — || March 20, 2007 || Kitt Peak || Spacewatch || — || align=right | 1.8 km || 
|-id=034 bgcolor=#E9E9E9
| 269034 ||  || — || March 20, 2007 || Kitt Peak || Spacewatch || — || align=right | 1.1 km || 
|-id=035 bgcolor=#E9E9E9
| 269035 ||  || — || March 20, 2007 || Mount Lemmon || Mount Lemmon Survey || — || align=right | 1.1 km || 
|-id=036 bgcolor=#E9E9E9
| 269036 ||  || — || March 20, 2007 || Mount Lemmon || Mount Lemmon Survey || — || align=right | 1.6 km || 
|-id=037 bgcolor=#E9E9E9
| 269037 ||  || — || March 20, 2007 || Kitt Peak || Spacewatch || — || align=right | 3.2 km || 
|-id=038 bgcolor=#E9E9E9
| 269038 ||  || — || March 20, 2007 || Anderson Mesa || LONEOS || JUN || align=right | 1.9 km || 
|-id=039 bgcolor=#E9E9E9
| 269039 ||  || — || March 20, 2007 || Kitt Peak || Spacewatch || — || align=right | 3.0 km || 
|-id=040 bgcolor=#E9E9E9
| 269040 ||  || — || March 20, 2007 || Kitt Peak || Spacewatch || — || align=right | 2.2 km || 
|-id=041 bgcolor=#E9E9E9
| 269041 ||  || — || March 20, 2007 || Kitt Peak || Spacewatch || — || align=right | 1.8 km || 
|-id=042 bgcolor=#E9E9E9
| 269042 ||  || — || March 20, 2007 || Kitt Peak || Spacewatch || — || align=right | 2.2 km || 
|-id=043 bgcolor=#E9E9E9
| 269043 ||  || — || March 21, 2007 || Socorro || LINEAR || — || align=right | 2.3 km || 
|-id=044 bgcolor=#E9E9E9
| 269044 ||  || — || March 26, 2007 || Mount Lemmon || Mount Lemmon Survey || WIT || align=right | 1.2 km || 
|-id=045 bgcolor=#E9E9E9
| 269045 ||  || — || March 27, 2007 || Siding Spring || SSS || — || align=right | 4.5 km || 
|-id=046 bgcolor=#E9E9E9
| 269046 ||  || — || March 25, 2007 || Mount Lemmon || Mount Lemmon Survey || ADE || align=right | 3.2 km || 
|-id=047 bgcolor=#E9E9E9
| 269047 ||  || — || March 27, 2007 || Siding Spring || SSS || — || align=right | 1.7 km || 
|-id=048 bgcolor=#E9E9E9
| 269048 ||  || — || March 18, 2007 || Kitt Peak || Spacewatch || — || align=right | 2.6 km || 
|-id=049 bgcolor=#E9E9E9
| 269049 ||  || — || March 20, 2007 || Catalina || CSS || — || align=right | 3.7 km || 
|-id=050 bgcolor=#fefefe
| 269050 ||  || — || April 11, 2007 || Mount Lemmon || Mount Lemmon Survey || — || align=right | 1.1 km || 
|-id=051 bgcolor=#d6d6d6
| 269051 ||  || — || April 11, 2007 || Kitt Peak || Spacewatch || EOS || align=right | 2.9 km || 
|-id=052 bgcolor=#E9E9E9
| 269052 ||  || — || April 11, 2007 || Kitt Peak || Spacewatch || — || align=right | 2.1 km || 
|-id=053 bgcolor=#E9E9E9
| 269053 ||  || — || April 11, 2007 || Kitt Peak || Spacewatch || — || align=right | 3.2 km || 
|-id=054 bgcolor=#E9E9E9
| 269054 ||  || — || April 11, 2007 || Mount Lemmon || Mount Lemmon Survey || — || align=right | 2.8 km || 
|-id=055 bgcolor=#E9E9E9
| 269055 ||  || — || April 11, 2007 || Kitt Peak || Spacewatch || — || align=right | 1.2 km || 
|-id=056 bgcolor=#E9E9E9
| 269056 ||  || — || April 11, 2007 || Kitt Peak || Spacewatch || RAF || align=right | 1.7 km || 
|-id=057 bgcolor=#E9E9E9
| 269057 ||  || — || April 11, 2007 || Siding Spring || SSS || — || align=right | 3.3 km || 
|-id=058 bgcolor=#E9E9E9
| 269058 ||  || — || April 11, 2007 || Siding Spring || SSS || — || align=right | 3.0 km || 
|-id=059 bgcolor=#E9E9E9
| 269059 ||  || — || April 14, 2007 || Mount Lemmon || Mount Lemmon Survey || AGN || align=right | 1.4 km || 
|-id=060 bgcolor=#fefefe
| 269060 ||  || — || April 11, 2007 || Mount Lemmon || Mount Lemmon Survey || — || align=right | 1.2 km || 
|-id=061 bgcolor=#E9E9E9
| 269061 ||  || — || April 11, 2007 || Catalina || CSS || — || align=right | 2.7 km || 
|-id=062 bgcolor=#E9E9E9
| 269062 ||  || — || April 11, 2007 || Kitt Peak || Spacewatch || GEF || align=right | 1.4 km || 
|-id=063 bgcolor=#E9E9E9
| 269063 ||  || — || April 14, 2007 || Kitt Peak || Spacewatch || NEM || align=right | 2.8 km || 
|-id=064 bgcolor=#E9E9E9
| 269064 ||  || — || April 14, 2007 || Kitt Peak || Spacewatch || AGN || align=right | 1.3 km || 
|-id=065 bgcolor=#E9E9E9
| 269065 ||  || — || April 14, 2007 || Kitt Peak || Spacewatch || AGN || align=right | 1.6 km || 
|-id=066 bgcolor=#d6d6d6
| 269066 ||  || — || April 14, 2007 || Mount Lemmon || Mount Lemmon Survey || — || align=right | 2.5 km || 
|-id=067 bgcolor=#E9E9E9
| 269067 ||  || — || April 14, 2007 || Kitt Peak || Spacewatch || — || align=right | 3.3 km || 
|-id=068 bgcolor=#E9E9E9
| 269068 ||  || — || April 14, 2007 || Kitt Peak || Spacewatch || — || align=right | 1.4 km || 
|-id=069 bgcolor=#E9E9E9
| 269069 ||  || — || April 14, 2007 || Kitt Peak || Spacewatch || — || align=right | 3.2 km || 
|-id=070 bgcolor=#E9E9E9
| 269070 ||  || — || April 14, 2007 || Kitt Peak || Spacewatch || — || align=right | 1.5 km || 
|-id=071 bgcolor=#fefefe
| 269071 ||  || — || April 14, 2007 || Kitt Peak || Spacewatch || — || align=right | 1.5 km || 
|-id=072 bgcolor=#E9E9E9
| 269072 ||  || — || April 15, 2007 || Catalina || CSS || — || align=right | 1.3 km || 
|-id=073 bgcolor=#E9E9E9
| 269073 ||  || — || April 15, 2007 || Kitt Peak || Spacewatch || — || align=right | 1.4 km || 
|-id=074 bgcolor=#E9E9E9
| 269074 ||  || — || April 15, 2007 || Kitt Peak || Spacewatch || — || align=right | 2.1 km || 
|-id=075 bgcolor=#E9E9E9
| 269075 ||  || — || April 15, 2007 || Kitt Peak || Spacewatch || AGN || align=right | 1.6 km || 
|-id=076 bgcolor=#E9E9E9
| 269076 ||  || — || April 14, 2007 || Kitt Peak || Spacewatch || — || align=right | 2.2 km || 
|-id=077 bgcolor=#E9E9E9
| 269077 ||  || — || April 15, 2007 || Kitt Peak || Spacewatch || — || align=right | 3.3 km || 
|-id=078 bgcolor=#E9E9E9
| 269078 ||  || — || April 15, 2007 || Kitt Peak || Spacewatch || — || align=right | 1.5 km || 
|-id=079 bgcolor=#E9E9E9
| 269079 ||  || — || April 16, 2007 || Catalina || CSS || — || align=right | 4.7 km || 
|-id=080 bgcolor=#E9E9E9
| 269080 ||  || — || April 16, 2007 || Catalina || CSS || — || align=right | 2.8 km || 
|-id=081 bgcolor=#E9E9E9
| 269081 ||  || — || April 18, 2007 || Mount Lemmon || Mount Lemmon Survey || HOF || align=right | 2.8 km || 
|-id=082 bgcolor=#E9E9E9
| 269082 ||  || — || April 16, 2007 || Catalina || CSS || — || align=right | 1.9 km || 
|-id=083 bgcolor=#E9E9E9
| 269083 ||  || — || April 18, 2007 || Lulin Observatory || LUSS || — || align=right | 2.4 km || 
|-id=084 bgcolor=#E9E9E9
| 269084 ||  || — || April 16, 2007 || Anderson Mesa || LONEOS || — || align=right | 2.2 km || 
|-id=085 bgcolor=#E9E9E9
| 269085 ||  || — || April 18, 2007 || Kitt Peak || Spacewatch || — || align=right | 2.0 km || 
|-id=086 bgcolor=#E9E9E9
| 269086 ||  || — || April 19, 2007 || Mount Lemmon || Mount Lemmon Survey || — || align=right | 1.8 km || 
|-id=087 bgcolor=#E9E9E9
| 269087 ||  || — || April 19, 2007 || Mount Lemmon || Mount Lemmon Survey || MIS || align=right | 3.0 km || 
|-id=088 bgcolor=#E9E9E9
| 269088 ||  || — || April 19, 2007 || Kitt Peak || Spacewatch || — || align=right | 1.3 km || 
|-id=089 bgcolor=#E9E9E9
| 269089 ||  || — || April 20, 2007 || Mount Lemmon || Mount Lemmon Survey || — || align=right | 1.7 km || 
|-id=090 bgcolor=#E9E9E9
| 269090 ||  || — || April 20, 2007 || Socorro || LINEAR || ADE || align=right | 3.4 km || 
|-id=091 bgcolor=#E9E9E9
| 269091 ||  || — || April 20, 2007 || Anderson Mesa || LONEOS || — || align=right | 3.4 km || 
|-id=092 bgcolor=#E9E9E9
| 269092 ||  || — || April 20, 2007 || Kitt Peak || Spacewatch || — || align=right | 1.1 km || 
|-id=093 bgcolor=#E9E9E9
| 269093 ||  || — || April 20, 2007 || Kitt Peak || Spacewatch || — || align=right | 2.1 km || 
|-id=094 bgcolor=#E9E9E9
| 269094 ||  || — || April 23, 2007 || Kitt Peak || Spacewatch || — || align=right | 2.2 km || 
|-id=095 bgcolor=#E9E9E9
| 269095 ||  || — || April 22, 2007 || Catalina || CSS || MIT || align=right | 2.6 km || 
|-id=096 bgcolor=#E9E9E9
| 269096 ||  || — || April 22, 2007 || Catalina || CSS || RAF || align=right | 1.4 km || 
|-id=097 bgcolor=#E9E9E9
| 269097 ||  || — || April 22, 2007 || Mount Lemmon || Mount Lemmon Survey || — || align=right | 3.4 km || 
|-id=098 bgcolor=#d6d6d6
| 269098 ||  || — || April 22, 2007 || Catalina || CSS || — || align=right | 6.1 km || 
|-id=099 bgcolor=#E9E9E9
| 269099 ||  || — || April 23, 2007 || Mount Lemmon || Mount Lemmon Survey || — || align=right | 2.5 km || 
|-id=100 bgcolor=#E9E9E9
| 269100 ||  || — || April 24, 2007 || Kitt Peak || Spacewatch || — || align=right | 1.3 km || 
|}

269101–269200 

|-bgcolor=#E9E9E9
| 269101 ||  || — || April 22, 2007 || Catalina || CSS || HNS || align=right | 1.7 km || 
|-id=102 bgcolor=#E9E9E9
| 269102 ||  || — || April 23, 2007 || Kitt Peak || Spacewatch || — || align=right | 3.1 km || 
|-id=103 bgcolor=#E9E9E9
| 269103 ||  || — || April 23, 2007 || Kitt Peak || Spacewatch || — || align=right | 3.1 km || 
|-id=104 bgcolor=#E9E9E9
| 269104 ||  || — || April 24, 2007 || Kitt Peak || Spacewatch || — || align=right | 2.5 km || 
|-id=105 bgcolor=#E9E9E9
| 269105 ||  || — || April 19, 2007 || Anderson Mesa || LONEOS || — || align=right | 3.1 km || 
|-id=106 bgcolor=#E9E9E9
| 269106 ||  || — || April 19, 2007 || Mount Lemmon || Mount Lemmon Survey || DOR || align=right | 2.9 km || 
|-id=107 bgcolor=#E9E9E9
| 269107 ||  || — || May 6, 2007 || Kitt Peak || Spacewatch || — || align=right | 1.9 km || 
|-id=108 bgcolor=#E9E9E9
| 269108 ||  || — || May 9, 2007 || Mount Lemmon || Mount Lemmon Survey || AST || align=right | 2.6 km || 
|-id=109 bgcolor=#E9E9E9
| 269109 ||  || — || May 9, 2007 || Kitt Peak || Spacewatch || DOR || align=right | 2.5 km || 
|-id=110 bgcolor=#E9E9E9
| 269110 ||  || — || May 9, 2007 || Kitt Peak || Spacewatch || HNA || align=right | 2.7 km || 
|-id=111 bgcolor=#E9E9E9
| 269111 ||  || — || May 12, 2007 || Mount Lemmon || Mount Lemmon Survey || — || align=right | 1.8 km || 
|-id=112 bgcolor=#E9E9E9
| 269112 ||  || — || May 12, 2007 || Mount Lemmon || Mount Lemmon Survey || HNA || align=right | 2.5 km || 
|-id=113 bgcolor=#E9E9E9
| 269113 ||  || — || May 12, 2007 || Mount Lemmon || Mount Lemmon Survey || NEM || align=right | 3.2 km || 
|-id=114 bgcolor=#E9E9E9
| 269114 ||  || — || May 15, 2007 || Kitt Peak || Spacewatch || — || align=right | 2.2 km || 
|-id=115 bgcolor=#E9E9E9
| 269115 ||  || — || May 11, 2007 || Siding Spring || SSS || — || align=right | 2.7 km || 
|-id=116 bgcolor=#E9E9E9
| 269116 ||  || — || May 24, 2007 || Catalina || CSS || — || align=right | 3.4 km || 
|-id=117 bgcolor=#E9E9E9
| 269117 ||  || — || June 9, 2007 || Kitt Peak || Spacewatch || — || align=right | 2.4 km || 
|-id=118 bgcolor=#E9E9E9
| 269118 ||  || — || June 12, 2007 || Reedy Creek || J. Broughton || — || align=right | 2.5 km || 
|-id=119 bgcolor=#E9E9E9
| 269119 ||  || — || June 15, 2007 || Kitt Peak || Spacewatch || — || align=right | 3.9 km || 
|-id=120 bgcolor=#d6d6d6
| 269120 ||  || — || June 12, 2007 || Catalina || CSS || — || align=right | 6.7 km || 
|-id=121 bgcolor=#d6d6d6
| 269121 ||  || — || June 19, 2007 || Kitt Peak || Spacewatch || — || align=right | 4.5 km || 
|-id=122 bgcolor=#d6d6d6
| 269122 ||  || — || June 23, 2007 || Kitt Peak || Spacewatch || — || align=right | 2.6 km || 
|-id=123 bgcolor=#E9E9E9
| 269123 ||  || — || July 12, 2007 || Mayhill || A. Lowe || — || align=right | 2.6 km || 
|-id=124 bgcolor=#d6d6d6
| 269124 ||  || — || August 11, 2007 || Anderson Mesa || LONEOS || 7:4 || align=right | 6.6 km || 
|-id=125 bgcolor=#d6d6d6
| 269125 ||  || — || August 13, 2007 || Socorro || LINEAR || HYG || align=right | 4.4 km || 
|-id=126 bgcolor=#d6d6d6
| 269126 ||  || — || August 11, 2007 || Bergisch Gladbach || W. Bickel || — || align=right | 4.8 km || 
|-id=127 bgcolor=#d6d6d6
| 269127 ||  || — || August 8, 2007 || Socorro || LINEAR || HYG || align=right | 3.8 km || 
|-id=128 bgcolor=#d6d6d6
| 269128 ||  || — || August 13, 2007 || Siding Spring || SSS || BRA || align=right | 2.3 km || 
|-id=129 bgcolor=#fefefe
| 269129 ||  || — || September 3, 2007 || Catalina || CSS || V || align=right data-sort-value="0.76" | 760 m || 
|-id=130 bgcolor=#d6d6d6
| 269130 ||  || — || September 10, 2007 || Mount Lemmon || Mount Lemmon Survey || — || align=right | 2.9 km || 
|-id=131 bgcolor=#d6d6d6
| 269131 ||  || — || September 11, 2007 || Kitt Peak || Spacewatch || — || align=right | 3.3 km || 
|-id=132 bgcolor=#fefefe
| 269132 ||  || — || September 11, 2007 || Catalina || CSS || H || align=right | 1.1 km || 
|-id=133 bgcolor=#d6d6d6
| 269133 ||  || — || September 16, 2007 || Socorro || LINEAR || — || align=right | 4.3 km || 
|-id=134 bgcolor=#E9E9E9
| 269134 ||  || — || October 8, 2007 || Mount Lemmon || Mount Lemmon Survey || PAD || align=right | 3.2 km || 
|-id=135 bgcolor=#d6d6d6
| 269135 ||  || — || October 5, 2007 || Kitt Peak || Spacewatch || HYG || align=right | 2.8 km || 
|-id=136 bgcolor=#d6d6d6
| 269136 ||  || — || October 11, 2007 || Socorro || LINEAR || — || align=right | 5.4 km || 
|-id=137 bgcolor=#d6d6d6
| 269137 ||  || — || October 6, 2007 || Kitt Peak || Spacewatch || LIX || align=right | 4.1 km || 
|-id=138 bgcolor=#d6d6d6
| 269138 ||  || — || October 5, 2007 || Kitt Peak || Spacewatch || — || align=right | 3.5 km || 
|-id=139 bgcolor=#d6d6d6
| 269139 ||  || — || October 9, 2007 || Anderson Mesa || LONEOS || 7:4 || align=right | 6.9 km || 
|-id=140 bgcolor=#d6d6d6
| 269140 ||  || — || October 16, 2007 || Kitt Peak || Spacewatch || LIX || align=right | 4.6 km || 
|-id=141 bgcolor=#d6d6d6
| 269141 ||  || — || October 30, 2007 || Mount Lemmon || Mount Lemmon Survey || URS || align=right | 3.8 km || 
|-id=142 bgcolor=#fefefe
| 269142 ||  || — || November 2, 2007 || Kitt Peak || Spacewatch || FLO || align=right data-sort-value="0.65" | 650 m || 
|-id=143 bgcolor=#d6d6d6
| 269143 ||  || — || November 18, 2007 || Mount Lemmon || Mount Lemmon Survey || — || align=right | 4.3 km || 
|-id=144 bgcolor=#fefefe
| 269144 ||  || — || January 10, 2008 || Catalina || CSS || H || align=right data-sort-value="0.93" | 930 m || 
|-id=145 bgcolor=#fefefe
| 269145 ||  || — || February 2, 2008 || Kitt Peak || Spacewatch || — || align=right data-sort-value="0.74" | 740 m || 
|-id=146 bgcolor=#fefefe
| 269146 ||  || — || February 9, 2008 || Mount Lemmon || Mount Lemmon Survey || — || align=right | 1.1 km || 
|-id=147 bgcolor=#fefefe
| 269147 ||  || — || February 27, 2008 || Calvin-Rehoboth || Calvin–Rehoboth Obs. || — || align=right data-sort-value="0.96" | 960 m || 
|-id=148 bgcolor=#fefefe
| 269148 ||  || — || October 2, 2003 || Kitt Peak || Spacewatch || — || align=right data-sort-value="0.67" | 670 m || 
|-id=149 bgcolor=#fefefe
| 269149 ||  || — || March 2, 2008 || Catalina || CSS || — || align=right data-sort-value="0.90" | 900 m || 
|-id=150 bgcolor=#fefefe
| 269150 ||  || — || March 2, 2008 || Kitt Peak || Spacewatch || FLO || align=right data-sort-value="0.77" | 770 m || 
|-id=151 bgcolor=#fefefe
| 269151 ||  || — || March 4, 2008 || Mount Lemmon || Mount Lemmon Survey || FLO || align=right data-sort-value="0.62" | 620 m || 
|-id=152 bgcolor=#fefefe
| 269152 ||  || — || March 1, 2008 || Kitt Peak || Spacewatch || — || align=right data-sort-value="0.92" | 920 m || 
|-id=153 bgcolor=#fefefe
| 269153 ||  || — || March 6, 2008 || Kitt Peak || Spacewatch || — || align=right data-sort-value="0.76" | 760 m || 
|-id=154 bgcolor=#fefefe
| 269154 ||  || — || March 9, 2008 || Mount Lemmon || Mount Lemmon Survey || — || align=right data-sort-value="0.85" | 850 m || 
|-id=155 bgcolor=#fefefe
| 269155 ||  || — || March 7, 2008 || Kitt Peak || Spacewatch || FLO || align=right data-sort-value="0.56" | 560 m || 
|-id=156 bgcolor=#fefefe
| 269156 ||  || — || March 8, 2008 || Catalina || CSS || — || align=right | 1.1 km || 
|-id=157 bgcolor=#fefefe
| 269157 ||  || — || March 3, 2008 || Catalina || CSS || — || align=right | 1.2 km || 
|-id=158 bgcolor=#fefefe
| 269158 ||  || — || March 8, 2008 || Kitt Peak || Spacewatch || — || align=right data-sort-value="0.94" | 940 m || 
|-id=159 bgcolor=#fefefe
| 269159 ||  || — || March 8, 2008 || Kitt Peak || Spacewatch || FLO || align=right data-sort-value="0.83" | 830 m || 
|-id=160 bgcolor=#fefefe
| 269160 ||  || — || March 10, 2008 || Kitt Peak || Spacewatch || — || align=right data-sort-value="0.84" | 840 m || 
|-id=161 bgcolor=#fefefe
| 269161 ||  || — || March 4, 2008 || Mount Lemmon || Mount Lemmon Survey || NYS || align=right data-sort-value="0.82" | 820 m || 
|-id=162 bgcolor=#fefefe
| 269162 ||  || — || March 15, 2008 || Mount Lemmon || Mount Lemmon Survey || — || align=right data-sort-value="0.79" | 790 m || 
|-id=163 bgcolor=#fefefe
| 269163 ||  || — || March 11, 2008 || Kitt Peak || Spacewatch || NYS || align=right | 2.0 km || 
|-id=164 bgcolor=#fefefe
| 269164 ||  || — || March 26, 2008 || Kitt Peak || Spacewatch || FLO || align=right data-sort-value="0.83" | 830 m || 
|-id=165 bgcolor=#fefefe
| 269165 ||  || — || March 27, 2008 || Kitt Peak || Spacewatch || — || align=right | 1.2 km || 
|-id=166 bgcolor=#fefefe
| 269166 ||  || — || March 28, 2008 || Mount Lemmon || Mount Lemmon Survey || V || align=right data-sort-value="0.78" | 780 m || 
|-id=167 bgcolor=#fefefe
| 269167 ||  || — || March 29, 2008 || Kitt Peak || Spacewatch || — || align=right | 1.0 km || 
|-id=168 bgcolor=#fefefe
| 269168 ||  || — || March 29, 2008 || Kitt Peak || Spacewatch || NYS || align=right | 2.7 km || 
|-id=169 bgcolor=#fefefe
| 269169 ||  || — || March 29, 2008 || Jarnac || Jarnac Obs. || — || align=right data-sort-value="0.77" | 770 m || 
|-id=170 bgcolor=#fefefe
| 269170 ||  || — || March 10, 2008 || Mount Lemmon || Mount Lemmon Survey || FLO || align=right data-sort-value="0.83" | 830 m || 
|-id=171 bgcolor=#fefefe
| 269171 ||  || — || March 29, 2008 || Catalina || CSS || FLO || align=right data-sort-value="0.85" | 850 m || 
|-id=172 bgcolor=#fefefe
| 269172 ||  || — || March 30, 2008 || Catalina || CSS || NYS || align=right data-sort-value="0.99" | 990 m || 
|-id=173 bgcolor=#fefefe
| 269173 ||  || — || March 28, 2008 || Kitt Peak || Spacewatch || FLO || align=right data-sort-value="0.68" | 680 m || 
|-id=174 bgcolor=#fefefe
| 269174 ||  || — || March 30, 2008 || Socorro || LINEAR || FLO || align=right data-sort-value="0.94" | 940 m || 
|-id=175 bgcolor=#fefefe
| 269175 ||  || — || March 28, 2008 || Mount Lemmon || Mount Lemmon Survey || — || align=right data-sort-value="0.71" | 710 m || 
|-id=176 bgcolor=#fefefe
| 269176 ||  || — || March 29, 2008 || Mount Lemmon || Mount Lemmon Survey || NYS || align=right data-sort-value="0.90" | 900 m || 
|-id=177 bgcolor=#fefefe
| 269177 ||  || — || March 30, 2008 || Kitt Peak || Spacewatch || — || align=right | 1.1 km || 
|-id=178 bgcolor=#fefefe
| 269178 ||  || — || March 31, 2008 || Kitt Peak || Spacewatch || FLO || align=right data-sort-value="0.62" | 620 m || 
|-id=179 bgcolor=#fefefe
| 269179 ||  || — || March 30, 2008 || Kitt Peak || Spacewatch || — || align=right data-sort-value="0.85" | 850 m || 
|-id=180 bgcolor=#fefefe
| 269180 ||  || — || March 29, 2008 || Kitt Peak || Spacewatch || — || align=right data-sort-value="0.82" | 820 m || 
|-id=181 bgcolor=#fefefe
| 269181 ||  || — || March 31, 2008 || Kitt Peak || Spacewatch || — || align=right data-sort-value="0.86" | 860 m || 
|-id=182 bgcolor=#fefefe
| 269182 ||  || — || April 1, 2008 || Kitt Peak || Spacewatch || — || align=right | 1.1 km || 
|-id=183 bgcolor=#fefefe
| 269183 ||  || — || April 4, 2008 || Mount Lemmon || Mount Lemmon Survey || — || align=right data-sort-value="0.94" | 940 m || 
|-id=184 bgcolor=#fefefe
| 269184 ||  || — || April 3, 2008 || Kitt Peak || Spacewatch || FLO || align=right data-sort-value="0.67" | 670 m || 
|-id=185 bgcolor=#fefefe
| 269185 ||  || — || April 3, 2008 || Kitt Peak || Spacewatch || NYS || align=right data-sort-value="0.77" | 770 m || 
|-id=186 bgcolor=#fefefe
| 269186 ||  || — || April 4, 2008 || Kitt Peak || Spacewatch || — || align=right | 1.0 km || 
|-id=187 bgcolor=#fefefe
| 269187 ||  || — || April 4, 2008 || Kitt Peak || Spacewatch || FLO || align=right data-sort-value="0.99" | 990 m || 
|-id=188 bgcolor=#fefefe
| 269188 ||  || — || April 4, 2008 || Kitt Peak || Spacewatch || NYS || align=right data-sort-value="0.80" | 800 m || 
|-id=189 bgcolor=#fefefe
| 269189 ||  || — || April 5, 2008 || Mount Lemmon || Mount Lemmon Survey || — || align=right data-sort-value="0.71" | 710 m || 
|-id=190 bgcolor=#fefefe
| 269190 ||  || — || April 6, 2008 || Kitt Peak || Spacewatch || FLO || align=right data-sort-value="0.81" | 810 m || 
|-id=191 bgcolor=#fefefe
| 269191 ||  || — || April 7, 2008 || Mount Lemmon || Mount Lemmon Survey || — || align=right | 1.2 km || 
|-id=192 bgcolor=#fefefe
| 269192 ||  || — || April 8, 2008 || Kitt Peak || Spacewatch || — || align=right data-sort-value="0.98" | 980 m || 
|-id=193 bgcolor=#fefefe
| 269193 ||  || — || April 9, 2008 || Kitt Peak || Spacewatch || NYS || align=right data-sort-value="0.67" | 670 m || 
|-id=194 bgcolor=#fefefe
| 269194 ||  || — || April 15, 2008 || Mount Lemmon || Mount Lemmon Survey || V || align=right data-sort-value="0.79" | 790 m || 
|-id=195 bgcolor=#fefefe
| 269195 ||  || — || April 8, 2008 || Kitt Peak || Spacewatch || — || align=right data-sort-value="0.78" | 780 m || 
|-id=196 bgcolor=#E9E9E9
| 269196 ||  || — || April 6, 2008 || Kitt Peak || Spacewatch || — || align=right | 2.1 km || 
|-id=197 bgcolor=#fefefe
| 269197 ||  || — || April 25, 2008 || La Sagra || OAM Obs. || FLO || align=right data-sort-value="0.58" | 580 m || 
|-id=198 bgcolor=#fefefe
| 269198 ||  || — || April 28, 2008 || Kitt Peak || Spacewatch || — || align=right | 1.2 km || 
|-id=199 bgcolor=#fefefe
| 269199 ||  || — || April 27, 2008 || Kitt Peak || Spacewatch || V || align=right data-sort-value="0.82" | 820 m || 
|-id=200 bgcolor=#fefefe
| 269200 ||  || — || April 29, 2008 || Mount Lemmon || Mount Lemmon Survey || FLO || align=right data-sort-value="0.81" | 810 m || 
|}

269201–269300 

|-bgcolor=#fefefe
| 269201 ||  || — || April 29, 2008 || Mount Lemmon || Mount Lemmon Survey || V || align=right data-sort-value="0.65" | 650 m || 
|-id=202 bgcolor=#fefefe
| 269202 ||  || — || May 2, 2008 || Catalina || CSS || — || align=right | 1.1 km || 
|-id=203 bgcolor=#fefefe
| 269203 ||  || — || May 4, 2008 || Mount Lemmon || Mount Lemmon Survey || — || align=right | 1.1 km || 
|-id=204 bgcolor=#fefefe
| 269204 ||  || — || May 6, 2008 || Mount Lemmon || Mount Lemmon Survey || V || align=right data-sort-value="0.75" | 750 m || 
|-id=205 bgcolor=#fefefe
| 269205 ||  || — || May 5, 2008 || Kitt Peak || Spacewatch || — || align=right data-sort-value="0.80" | 800 m || 
|-id=206 bgcolor=#fefefe
| 269206 ||  || — || May 5, 2008 || Mount Lemmon || Mount Lemmon Survey || — || align=right | 1.2 km || 
|-id=207 bgcolor=#fefefe
| 269207 ||  || — || May 3, 2008 || Mount Lemmon || Mount Lemmon Survey || FLO || align=right data-sort-value="0.73" | 730 m || 
|-id=208 bgcolor=#fefefe
| 269208 ||  || — || May 27, 2008 || Kitt Peak || Spacewatch || — || align=right data-sort-value="0.88" | 880 m || 
|-id=209 bgcolor=#E9E9E9
| 269209 ||  || — || May 28, 2008 || Kitt Peak || Spacewatch || — || align=right | 2.3 km || 
|-id=210 bgcolor=#E9E9E9
| 269210 ||  || — || May 28, 2008 || Mount Lemmon || Mount Lemmon Survey || — || align=right | 2.1 km || 
|-id=211 bgcolor=#fefefe
| 269211 ||  || — || May 29, 2008 || Kitt Peak || Spacewatch || — || align=right data-sort-value="0.83" | 830 m || 
|-id=212 bgcolor=#fefefe
| 269212 ||  || — || June 3, 2008 || Kitt Peak || Spacewatch || — || align=right data-sort-value="0.93" | 930 m || 
|-id=213 bgcolor=#fefefe
| 269213 ||  || — || June 6, 2008 || Kitt Peak || Spacewatch || FLO || align=right data-sort-value="0.70" | 700 m || 
|-id=214 bgcolor=#fefefe
| 269214 ||  || — || June 7, 2008 || Kitt Peak || Spacewatch || FLO || align=right data-sort-value="0.73" | 730 m || 
|-id=215 bgcolor=#E9E9E9
| 269215 ||  || — || June 8, 2008 || Kitt Peak || Spacewatch || — || align=right | 1.8 km || 
|-id=216 bgcolor=#fefefe
| 269216 ||  || — || June 9, 2008 || Kitt Peak || Spacewatch || — || align=right | 3.4 km || 
|-id=217 bgcolor=#E9E9E9
| 269217 ||  || — || July 1, 2008 || Eskridge || G. Hug || PAL || align=right | 2.4 km || 
|-id=218 bgcolor=#E9E9E9
| 269218 ||  || — || July 5, 2008 || Pla D'Arguines || R. Ferrando || HNS || align=right | 1.7 km || 
|-id=219 bgcolor=#fefefe
| 269219 ||  || — || July 2, 2008 || Kitt Peak || Spacewatch || — || align=right | 1.0 km || 
|-id=220 bgcolor=#E9E9E9
| 269220 ||  || — || January 23, 2006 || Mount Lemmon || Mount Lemmon Survey || MRX || align=right | 1.4 km || 
|-id=221 bgcolor=#d6d6d6
| 269221 ||  || — || July 30, 2008 || Kitt Peak || Spacewatch || KOR || align=right | 1.8 km || 
|-id=222 bgcolor=#d6d6d6
| 269222 ||  || — || July 29, 2008 || Kitt Peak || Spacewatch || — || align=right | 2.3 km || 
|-id=223 bgcolor=#d6d6d6
| 269223 ||  || — || July 30, 2008 || Kitt Peak || Spacewatch || KAR || align=right | 1.8 km || 
|-id=224 bgcolor=#d6d6d6
| 269224 ||  || — || July 30, 2008 || Kitt Peak || Spacewatch || — || align=right | 3.2 km || 
|-id=225 bgcolor=#fefefe
| 269225 ||  || — || July 30, 2008 || Kitt Peak || Spacewatch || NYS || align=right data-sort-value="0.91" | 910 m || 
|-id=226 bgcolor=#d6d6d6
| 269226 ||  || — || August 5, 2008 || Hibiscus || S. F. Hönig, N. Teamo || — || align=right | 4.1 km || 
|-id=227 bgcolor=#fefefe
| 269227 ||  || — || August 7, 2008 || Dauban || F. Kugel || — || align=right | 1.2 km || 
|-id=228 bgcolor=#d6d6d6
| 269228 ||  || — || August 11, 2008 || Pla D'Arguines || R. Ferrando || VER || align=right | 3.2 km || 
|-id=229 bgcolor=#d6d6d6
| 269229 ||  || — || August 11, 2008 || La Sagra || OAM Obs. || ALA || align=right | 5.5 km || 
|-id=230 bgcolor=#fefefe
| 269230 ||  || — || August 7, 2008 || Kitt Peak || Spacewatch || — || align=right data-sort-value="0.94" | 940 m || 
|-id=231 bgcolor=#d6d6d6
| 269231 ||  || — || August 7, 2008 || Kitt Peak || Spacewatch || — || align=right | 4.8 km || 
|-id=232 bgcolor=#d6d6d6
| 269232 Tahin || 2008 QV ||  || August 21, 2008 || Piszkéstető || K. Sárneczky || — || align=right | 3.2 km || 
|-id=233 bgcolor=#d6d6d6
| 269233 ||  || — || August 22, 2008 || Kitt Peak || Spacewatch || — || align=right | 4.9 km || 
|-id=234 bgcolor=#E9E9E9
| 269234 ||  || — || August 26, 2008 || Prairie Grass || J. Mahony || GEF || align=right | 2.0 km || 
|-id=235 bgcolor=#E9E9E9
| 269235 ||  || — || August 21, 2008 || Kitt Peak || Spacewatch || GEF || align=right | 1.9 km || 
|-id=236 bgcolor=#E9E9E9
| 269236 ||  || — || August 25, 2008 || La Sagra || OAM Obs. || — || align=right | 2.1 km || 
|-id=237 bgcolor=#E9E9E9
| 269237 ||  || — || August 25, 2008 || La Sagra || OAM Obs. || — || align=right | 4.9 km || 
|-id=238 bgcolor=#d6d6d6
| 269238 ||  || — || August 25, 2008 || La Sagra || OAM Obs. || EOS || align=right | 2.5 km || 
|-id=239 bgcolor=#E9E9E9
| 269239 ||  || — || August 26, 2008 || La Sagra || OAM Obs. || — || align=right | 2.7 km || 
|-id=240 bgcolor=#d6d6d6
| 269240 ||  || — || August 26, 2008 || La Sagra || OAM Obs. || — || align=right | 4.2 km || 
|-id=241 bgcolor=#E9E9E9
| 269241 ||  || — || August 26, 2008 || La Sagra || OAM Obs. || — || align=right | 1.2 km || 
|-id=242 bgcolor=#d6d6d6
| 269242 ||  || — || August 27, 2008 || La Sagra || OAM Obs. || — || align=right | 4.4 km || 
|-id=243 bgcolor=#d6d6d6
| 269243 Charbonnel ||  ||  || August 27, 2008 || Pises || J.-M. Lopez, C. Cavadore || — || align=right | 3.0 km || 
|-id=244 bgcolor=#E9E9E9
| 269244 ||  || — || August 27, 2008 || La Sagra || OAM Obs. || — || align=right | 2.2 km || 
|-id=245 bgcolor=#d6d6d6
| 269245 Catastini ||  ||  || August 27, 2008 || Andrushivka || Andrushivka Obs. || — || align=right | 4.0 km || 
|-id=246 bgcolor=#d6d6d6
| 269246 ||  || — || August 30, 2008 || Kleť || Kleť Obs. || — || align=right | 3.3 km || 
|-id=247 bgcolor=#E9E9E9
| 269247 ||  || — || August 25, 2008 || Socorro || LINEAR || JUN || align=right | 2.0 km || 
|-id=248 bgcolor=#d6d6d6
| 269248 ||  || — || August 25, 2008 || Tiki || N. Teamo || — || align=right | 4.3 km || 
|-id=249 bgcolor=#d6d6d6
| 269249 ||  || — || August 29, 2008 || Pla D'Arguines || R. Ferrando || — || align=right | 2.5 km || 
|-id=250 bgcolor=#d6d6d6
| 269250 ||  || — || August 29, 2008 || La Sagra || OAM Obs. || — || align=right | 4.1 km || 
|-id=251 bgcolor=#E9E9E9
| 269251 Kolomna ||  ||  || August 26, 2008 || Andrushivka || Andrushivka Obs. || JUN || align=right | 1.6 km || 
|-id=252 bgcolor=#d6d6d6
| 269252 Bogdanstupka ||  ||  || August 27, 2008 || Andrushivka || Andrushivka Obs. || EUP || align=right | 6.2 km || 
|-id=253 bgcolor=#d6d6d6
| 269253 ||  || — || August 31, 2008 || Moletai || Molėtai Obs. || CHA || align=right | 2.8 km || 
|-id=254 bgcolor=#d6d6d6
| 269254 ||  || — || August 21, 2008 || Kitt Peak || Spacewatch || — || align=right | 3.2 km || 
|-id=255 bgcolor=#E9E9E9
| 269255 ||  || — || August 21, 2008 || Kitt Peak || Spacewatch || — || align=right | 1.6 km || 
|-id=256 bgcolor=#E9E9E9
| 269256 ||  || — || August 26, 2008 || Črni Vrh || Črni Vrh || — || align=right | 5.6 km || 
|-id=257 bgcolor=#d6d6d6
| 269257 ||  || — || September 2, 2008 || Kitt Peak || Spacewatch || — || align=right | 4.0 km || 
|-id=258 bgcolor=#d6d6d6
| 269258 ||  || — || September 2, 2008 || Kitt Peak || Spacewatch || — || align=right | 2.9 km || 
|-id=259 bgcolor=#d6d6d6
| 269259 ||  || — || September 4, 2008 || Kitt Peak || Spacewatch || — || align=right | 3.9 km || 
|-id=260 bgcolor=#E9E9E9
| 269260 ||  || — || September 4, 2008 || Kitt Peak || Spacewatch || — || align=right | 2.3 km || 
|-id=261 bgcolor=#fefefe
| 269261 ||  || — || September 8, 2008 || Grove Creek || F. Tozzi || — || align=right | 1.3 km || 
|-id=262 bgcolor=#d6d6d6
| 269262 ||  || — || September 2, 2008 || Kitt Peak || Spacewatch || — || align=right | 6.4 km || 
|-id=263 bgcolor=#E9E9E9
| 269263 ||  || — || September 2, 2008 || La Sagra || OAM Obs. || — || align=right | 2.1 km || 
|-id=264 bgcolor=#d6d6d6
| 269264 ||  || — || September 3, 2008 || Kitt Peak || Spacewatch || — || align=right | 4.6 km || 
|-id=265 bgcolor=#d6d6d6
| 269265 ||  || — || September 3, 2008 || Kitt Peak || Spacewatch || — || align=right | 4.4 km || 
|-id=266 bgcolor=#d6d6d6
| 269266 ||  || — || September 4, 2008 || Kitt Peak || Spacewatch || — || align=right | 3.9 km || 
|-id=267 bgcolor=#d6d6d6
| 269267 ||  || — || September 4, 2008 || Kitt Peak || Spacewatch || — || align=right | 3.4 km || 
|-id=268 bgcolor=#E9E9E9
| 269268 ||  || — || September 5, 2008 || Kitt Peak || Spacewatch || — || align=right | 2.6 km || 
|-id=269 bgcolor=#fefefe
| 269269 ||  || — || September 6, 2008 || La Sagra || OAM Obs. || NYS || align=right | 1.0 km || 
|-id=270 bgcolor=#E9E9E9
| 269270 ||  || — || September 6, 2008 || Catalina || CSS || — || align=right | 2.1 km || 
|-id=271 bgcolor=#d6d6d6
| 269271 ||  || — || September 6, 2008 || Mount Lemmon || Mount Lemmon Survey || — || align=right | 2.2 km || 
|-id=272 bgcolor=#E9E9E9
| 269272 ||  || — || September 4, 2008 || Kitt Peak || Spacewatch || — || align=right | 3.5 km || 
|-id=273 bgcolor=#d6d6d6
| 269273 ||  || — || September 5, 2008 || Kitt Peak || Spacewatch || — || align=right | 5.0 km || 
|-id=274 bgcolor=#E9E9E9
| 269274 ||  || — || September 6, 2008 || Catalina || CSS || WIT || align=right | 1.2 km || 
|-id=275 bgcolor=#d6d6d6
| 269275 ||  || — || September 7, 2008 || Catalina || CSS || — || align=right | 4.5 km || 
|-id=276 bgcolor=#d6d6d6
| 269276 ||  || — || September 3, 2008 || Kitt Peak || Spacewatch || EOS || align=right | 2.5 km || 
|-id=277 bgcolor=#d6d6d6
| 269277 ||  || — || September 6, 2008 || Mount Lemmon || Mount Lemmon Survey || — || align=right | 2.9 km || 
|-id=278 bgcolor=#d6d6d6
| 269278 ||  || — || September 9, 2008 || Mount Lemmon || Mount Lemmon Survey || 7:4 || align=right | 5.5 km || 
|-id=279 bgcolor=#d6d6d6
| 269279 ||  || — || September 3, 2008 || Kitt Peak || Spacewatch || — || align=right | 2.9 km || 
|-id=280 bgcolor=#E9E9E9
| 269280 ||  || — || September 7, 2008 || Mount Lemmon || Mount Lemmon Survey || AGN || align=right | 1.5 km || 
|-id=281 bgcolor=#d6d6d6
| 269281 ||  || — || September 9, 2008 || Mount Lemmon || Mount Lemmon Survey || 628 || align=right | 2.4 km || 
|-id=282 bgcolor=#d6d6d6
| 269282 ||  || — || September 2, 2008 || Kitt Peak || Spacewatch || — || align=right | 3.0 km || 
|-id=283 bgcolor=#E9E9E9
| 269283 ||  || — || September 4, 2008 || Kitt Peak || Spacewatch || AGN || align=right | 1.7 km || 
|-id=284 bgcolor=#d6d6d6
| 269284 ||  || — || September 6, 2008 || Catalina || CSS || — || align=right | 4.2 km || 
|-id=285 bgcolor=#d6d6d6
| 269285 ||  || — || September 6, 2008 || Mount Lemmon || Mount Lemmon Survey || — || align=right | 3.0 km || 
|-id=286 bgcolor=#E9E9E9
| 269286 ||  || — || September 21, 2008 || Grove Creek || F. Tozzi || — || align=right | 2.1 km || 
|-id=287 bgcolor=#d6d6d6
| 269287 ||  || — || September 22, 2008 || Socorro || LINEAR || — || align=right | 4.1 km || 
|-id=288 bgcolor=#d6d6d6
| 269288 ||  || — || September 19, 2008 || Kitt Peak || Spacewatch || — || align=right | 2.8 km || 
|-id=289 bgcolor=#E9E9E9
| 269289 ||  || — || September 19, 2008 || Kitt Peak || Spacewatch || — || align=right | 4.2 km || 
|-id=290 bgcolor=#E9E9E9
| 269290 ||  || — || September 19, 2008 || Kitt Peak || Spacewatch || — || align=right | 1.1 km || 
|-id=291 bgcolor=#d6d6d6
| 269291 ||  || — || September 19, 2008 || Kitt Peak || Spacewatch || — || align=right | 3.6 km || 
|-id=292 bgcolor=#d6d6d6
| 269292 ||  || — || September 19, 2008 || Kitt Peak || Spacewatch || KOR || align=right | 3.9 km || 
|-id=293 bgcolor=#d6d6d6
| 269293 ||  || — || September 20, 2008 || Kitt Peak || Spacewatch || — || align=right | 4.7 km || 
|-id=294 bgcolor=#d6d6d6
| 269294 ||  || — || September 20, 2008 || Kitt Peak || Spacewatch || 3:2 || align=right | 5.3 km || 
|-id=295 bgcolor=#E9E9E9
| 269295 ||  || — || September 20, 2008 || Mount Lemmon || Mount Lemmon Survey || — || align=right data-sort-value="0.98" | 980 m || 
|-id=296 bgcolor=#d6d6d6
| 269296 ||  || — || September 20, 2008 || Mount Lemmon || Mount Lemmon Survey || — || align=right | 3.0 km || 
|-id=297 bgcolor=#E9E9E9
| 269297 ||  || — || September 21, 2008 || Catalina || CSS || — || align=right | 3.5 km || 
|-id=298 bgcolor=#d6d6d6
| 269298 ||  || — || September 22, 2008 || Kitt Peak || Spacewatch || — || align=right | 4.5 km || 
|-id=299 bgcolor=#d6d6d6
| 269299 ||  || — || September 23, 2008 || Catalina || CSS || — || align=right | 5.2 km || 
|-id=300 bgcolor=#d6d6d6
| 269300 Diego ||  ||  || September 26, 2008 || La Cañada || J. Lacruz || — || align=right | 3.8 km || 
|}

269301–269400 

|-bgcolor=#d6d6d6
| 269301 ||  || — || September 20, 2008 || Catalina || CSS || — || align=right | 5.8 km || 
|-id=302 bgcolor=#d6d6d6
| 269302 ||  || — || September 22, 2008 || Kitt Peak || Spacewatch || — || align=right | 4.7 km || 
|-id=303 bgcolor=#E9E9E9
| 269303 ||  || — || September 22, 2008 || Kitt Peak || Spacewatch || — || align=right | 2.9 km || 
|-id=304 bgcolor=#d6d6d6
| 269304 ||  || — || September 22, 2008 || Kitt Peak || Spacewatch || — || align=right | 5.0 km || 
|-id=305 bgcolor=#d6d6d6
| 269305 ||  || — || September 22, 2008 || Kitt Peak || Spacewatch || — || align=right | 3.1 km || 
|-id=306 bgcolor=#d6d6d6
| 269306 ||  || — || September 22, 2008 || Kitt Peak || Spacewatch || — || align=right | 4.1 km || 
|-id=307 bgcolor=#d6d6d6
| 269307 ||  || — || September 23, 2008 || Siding Spring || SSS || — || align=right | 3.7 km || 
|-id=308 bgcolor=#d6d6d6
| 269308 ||  || — || September 22, 2008 || Kitt Peak || Spacewatch || — || align=right | 5.5 km || 
|-id=309 bgcolor=#E9E9E9
| 269309 ||  || — || September 30, 2008 || Desert Moon || B. L. Stevens || — || align=right | 2.8 km || 
|-id=310 bgcolor=#E9E9E9
| 269310 ||  || — || September 22, 2008 || Socorro || LINEAR || — || align=right | 1.2 km || 
|-id=311 bgcolor=#d6d6d6
| 269311 ||  || — || September 22, 2008 || Socorro || LINEAR || — || align=right | 4.4 km || 
|-id=312 bgcolor=#E9E9E9
| 269312 ||  || — || September 22, 2008 || Socorro || LINEAR || WIT || align=right | 1.4 km || 
|-id=313 bgcolor=#d6d6d6
| 269313 ||  || — || September 23, 2008 || Socorro || LINEAR || — || align=right | 5.1 km || 
|-id=314 bgcolor=#d6d6d6
| 269314 ||  || — || September 24, 2008 || Socorro || LINEAR || — || align=right | 3.9 km || 
|-id=315 bgcolor=#d6d6d6
| 269315 ||  || — || September 28, 2008 || Socorro || LINEAR || THM || align=right | 4.4 km || 
|-id=316 bgcolor=#d6d6d6
| 269316 ||  || — || September 28, 2008 || Socorro || LINEAR || — || align=right | 5.5 km || 
|-id=317 bgcolor=#E9E9E9
| 269317 ||  || — || September 30, 2008 || Socorro || LINEAR || EUN || align=right | 2.0 km || 
|-id=318 bgcolor=#d6d6d6
| 269318 ||  || — || September 21, 2008 || Mount Lemmon || Mount Lemmon Survey || — || align=right | 3.8 km || 
|-id=319 bgcolor=#d6d6d6
| 269319 ||  || — || September 22, 2008 || Mount Lemmon || Mount Lemmon Survey || — || align=right | 3.5 km || 
|-id=320 bgcolor=#E9E9E9
| 269320 ||  || — || September 23, 2008 || Mount Lemmon || Mount Lemmon Survey || — || align=right | 1.6 km || 
|-id=321 bgcolor=#E9E9E9
| 269321 ||  || — || September 23, 2008 || Mount Lemmon || Mount Lemmon Survey || — || align=right | 2.4 km || 
|-id=322 bgcolor=#d6d6d6
| 269322 ||  || — || September 27, 2008 || Goodricke-Pigott || R. A. Tucker || — || align=right | 3.7 km || 
|-id=323 bgcolor=#d6d6d6
| 269323 Madisonvillehigh ||  ||  || September 28, 2008 || Charleston || ARO || — || align=right | 2.5 km || 
|-id=324 bgcolor=#d6d6d6
| 269324 ||  || — || September 30, 2008 || La Sagra || OAM Obs. || — || align=right | 4.8 km || 
|-id=325 bgcolor=#d6d6d6
| 269325 ||  || — || September 25, 2008 || Mount Lemmon || Mount Lemmon Survey || — || align=right | 2.6 km || 
|-id=326 bgcolor=#E9E9E9
| 269326 ||  || — || September 21, 2008 || Catalina || CSS || — || align=right | 3.8 km || 
|-id=327 bgcolor=#C2FFFF
| 269327 ||  || — || September 28, 2008 || Mount Lemmon || Mount Lemmon Survey || L4ERY || align=right | 10 km || 
|-id=328 bgcolor=#d6d6d6
| 269328 ||  || — || September 29, 2008 || Mount Lemmon || Mount Lemmon Survey || — || align=right | 3.5 km || 
|-id=329 bgcolor=#d6d6d6
| 269329 ||  || — || September 20, 2008 || Mount Lemmon || Mount Lemmon Survey || — || align=right | 3.4 km || 
|-id=330 bgcolor=#d6d6d6
| 269330 ||  || — || October 2, 2008 || Pla D'Arguines || R. Ferrando || — || align=right | 4.6 km || 
|-id=331 bgcolor=#d6d6d6
| 269331 ||  || — || October 3, 2008 || Socorro || LINEAR || — || align=right | 5.3 km || 
|-id=332 bgcolor=#d6d6d6
| 269332 ||  || — || October 3, 2008 || La Sagra || OAM Obs. || HIL3:2 || align=right | 5.8 km || 
|-id=333 bgcolor=#d6d6d6
| 269333 ||  || — || October 1, 2008 || Mount Lemmon || Mount Lemmon Survey || — || align=right | 2.9 km || 
|-id=334 bgcolor=#d6d6d6
| 269334 ||  || — || October 1, 2008 || Mount Lemmon || Mount Lemmon Survey || — || align=right | 5.7 km || 
|-id=335 bgcolor=#d6d6d6
| 269335 ||  || — || October 1, 2008 || Mount Lemmon || Mount Lemmon Survey || THM || align=right | 3.2 km || 
|-id=336 bgcolor=#d6d6d6
| 269336 ||  || — || October 1, 2008 || La Sagra || OAM Obs. || — || align=right | 3.0 km || 
|-id=337 bgcolor=#d6d6d6
| 269337 ||  || — || October 1, 2008 || Mount Lemmon || Mount Lemmon Survey || THM || align=right | 2.6 km || 
|-id=338 bgcolor=#d6d6d6
| 269338 ||  || — || October 1, 2008 || Kitt Peak || Spacewatch || — || align=right | 2.9 km || 
|-id=339 bgcolor=#d6d6d6
| 269339 ||  || — || October 1, 2008 || Mount Lemmon || Mount Lemmon Survey || — || align=right | 4.0 km || 
|-id=340 bgcolor=#d6d6d6
| 269340 ||  || — || October 1, 2008 || Mount Lemmon || Mount Lemmon Survey || — || align=right | 5.3 km || 
|-id=341 bgcolor=#d6d6d6
| 269341 ||  || — || October 2, 2008 || Kitt Peak || Spacewatch || — || align=right | 4.3 km || 
|-id=342 bgcolor=#E9E9E9
| 269342 ||  || — || October 4, 2008 || La Sagra || OAM Obs. || — || align=right | 3.1 km || 
|-id=343 bgcolor=#d6d6d6
| 269343 ||  || — || October 6, 2008 || La Sagra || OAM Obs. || — || align=right | 7.1 km || 
|-id=344 bgcolor=#E9E9E9
| 269344 ||  || — || October 6, 2008 || Kitt Peak || Spacewatch || — || align=right | 1.0 km || 
|-id=345 bgcolor=#d6d6d6
| 269345 ||  || — || October 6, 2008 || Kitt Peak || Spacewatch || 3:2 || align=right | 4.0 km || 
|-id=346 bgcolor=#d6d6d6
| 269346 ||  || — || October 6, 2008 || Mount Lemmon || Mount Lemmon Survey || — || align=right | 4.2 km || 
|-id=347 bgcolor=#d6d6d6
| 269347 ||  || — || October 6, 2008 || Catalina || CSS || 7:4 || align=right | 5.5 km || 
|-id=348 bgcolor=#d6d6d6
| 269348 ||  || — || October 8, 2008 || Kitt Peak || Spacewatch || — || align=right | 4.5 km || 
|-id=349 bgcolor=#d6d6d6
| 269349 ||  || — || October 1, 2008 || Catalina || CSS || — || align=right | 4.5 km || 
|-id=350 bgcolor=#d6d6d6
| 269350 ||  || — || October 17, 2008 || Kitt Peak || Spacewatch || — || align=right | 3.1 km || 
|-id=351 bgcolor=#d6d6d6
| 269351 ||  || — || October 17, 2008 || Kitt Peak || Spacewatch || ANF || align=right | 2.2 km || 
|-id=352 bgcolor=#d6d6d6
| 269352 ||  || — || October 17, 2008 || Kitt Peak || Spacewatch || KOR || align=right | 1.7 km || 
|-id=353 bgcolor=#d6d6d6
| 269353 ||  || — || October 20, 2008 || Kitt Peak || Spacewatch || — || align=right | 3.7 km || 
|-id=354 bgcolor=#d6d6d6
| 269354 ||  || — || October 20, 2008 || Mount Lemmon || Mount Lemmon Survey || — || align=right | 4.5 km || 
|-id=355 bgcolor=#d6d6d6
| 269355 ||  || — || October 21, 2008 || Kitt Peak || Spacewatch || — || align=right | 3.7 km || 
|-id=356 bgcolor=#C2FFFF
| 269356 ||  || — || October 26, 2008 || Cordell-Lorenz || D. T. Durig || L4 || align=right | 11 km || 
|-id=357 bgcolor=#E9E9E9
| 269357 ||  || — || October 25, 2008 || Socorro || LINEAR || — || align=right | 2.7 km || 
|-id=358 bgcolor=#E9E9E9
| 269358 ||  || — || October 22, 2008 || Kitt Peak || Spacewatch || — || align=right | 1.2 km || 
|-id=359 bgcolor=#d6d6d6
| 269359 ||  || — || October 27, 2008 || Catalina || CSS || ALA || align=right | 5.8 km || 
|-id=360 bgcolor=#d6d6d6
| 269360 ||  || — || October 27, 2008 || Mount Lemmon || Mount Lemmon Survey || — || align=right | 3.9 km || 
|-id=361 bgcolor=#d6d6d6
| 269361 ||  || — || October 31, 2008 || Catalina || CSS || — || align=right | 4.8 km || 
|-id=362 bgcolor=#d6d6d6
| 269362 ||  || — || October 20, 2008 || Kitt Peak || Spacewatch || — || align=right | 4.4 km || 
|-id=363 bgcolor=#d6d6d6
| 269363 ||  || — || October 20, 2008 || Kitt Peak || Spacewatch || — || align=right | 6.1 km || 
|-id=364 bgcolor=#d6d6d6
| 269364 ||  || — || October 27, 2008 || Mount Lemmon || Mount Lemmon Survey || — || align=right | 4.0 km || 
|-id=365 bgcolor=#d6d6d6
| 269365 ||  || — || November 3, 2008 || Catalina || CSS || — || align=right | 5.4 km || 
|-id=366 bgcolor=#E9E9E9
| 269366 ||  || — || November 17, 2008 || Kitt Peak || Spacewatch || — || align=right | 1.8 km || 
|-id=367 bgcolor=#fefefe
| 269367 ||  || — || November 17, 2008 || Kitt Peak || Spacewatch || NYS || align=right | 1.8 km || 
|-id=368 bgcolor=#d6d6d6
| 269368 ||  || — || November 18, 2008 || Catalina || CSS || 3:2 || align=right | 5.9 km || 
|-id=369 bgcolor=#d6d6d6
| 269369 ||  || — || November 18, 2008 || Catalina || CSS || — || align=right | 3.3 km || 
|-id=370 bgcolor=#fefefe
| 269370 ||  || — || December 30, 2008 || Kitt Peak || Spacewatch || — || align=right | 2.5 km || 
|-id=371 bgcolor=#E9E9E9
| 269371 ||  || — || December 30, 2008 || Catalina || CSS || — || align=right | 3.8 km || 
|-id=372 bgcolor=#d6d6d6
| 269372 ||  || — || December 31, 2008 || Mount Lemmon || Mount Lemmon Survey || — || align=right | 4.5 km || 
|-id=373 bgcolor=#E9E9E9
| 269373 ||  || — || December 22, 2008 || Kitt Peak || Spacewatch || — || align=right | 2.5 km || 
|-id=374 bgcolor=#d6d6d6
| 269374 ||  || — || January 13, 2009 || Calvin-Rehoboth || Calvin–Rehoboth Obs. || — || align=right | 5.3 km || 
|-id=375 bgcolor=#d6d6d6
| 269375 ||  || — || February 28, 2009 || Socorro || LINEAR || — || align=right | 5.1 km || 
|-id=376 bgcolor=#d6d6d6
| 269376 ||  || — || February 22, 2009 || Kitt Peak || Spacewatch || — || align=right | 4.9 km || 
|-id=377 bgcolor=#E9E9E9
| 269377 ||  || — || July 14, 2009 || La Sagra || OAM Obs. || — || align=right | 4.6 km || 
|-id=378 bgcolor=#E9E9E9
| 269378 ||  || — || July 14, 2009 || Kitt Peak || Spacewatch || EUN || align=right | 1.8 km || 
|-id=379 bgcolor=#d6d6d6
| 269379 ||  || — || July 21, 2009 || Črni Vrh Observatory|Črni Vrh || Črni Vrh || EUP || align=right | 5.6 km || 
|-id=380 bgcolor=#fefefe
| 269380 ||  || — || August 15, 2009 || La Sagra || OAM Obs. || — || align=right data-sort-value="0.94" | 940 m || 
|-id=381 bgcolor=#E9E9E9
| 269381 ||  || — || August 15, 2009 || Kitt Peak || Spacewatch || — || align=right | 1.8 km || 
|-id=382 bgcolor=#E9E9E9
| 269382 || 2009 QW || — || August 17, 2009 || Catalina || CSS || — || align=right | 3.8 km || 
|-id=383 bgcolor=#fefefe
| 269383 ||  || — || August 16, 2009 || La Sagra || OAM Obs. || — || align=right data-sort-value="0.85" | 850 m || 
|-id=384 bgcolor=#E9E9E9
| 269384 ||  || — || August 16, 2009 || Kitt Peak || Spacewatch || WIT || align=right | 1.1 km || 
|-id=385 bgcolor=#E9E9E9
| 269385 ||  || — || August 16, 2009 || Kitt Peak || Spacewatch || — || align=right | 2.5 km || 
|-id=386 bgcolor=#fefefe
| 269386 ||  || — || August 16, 2009 || Kitt Peak || Spacewatch || FLO || align=right data-sort-value="0.92" | 920 m || 
|-id=387 bgcolor=#fefefe
| 269387 ||  || — || August 20, 2009 || La Sagra || OAM Obs. || MAS || align=right data-sort-value="0.92" | 920 m || 
|-id=388 bgcolor=#fefefe
| 269388 ||  || — || August 20, 2009 || La Sagra || OAM Obs. || — || align=right | 1.3 km || 
|-id=389 bgcolor=#fefefe
| 269389 ||  || — || August 20, 2009 || Hibiscus || N. Teamo || — || align=right data-sort-value="0.98" | 980 m || 
|-id=390 bgcolor=#E9E9E9
| 269390 Igortkachenko ||  ||  || August 27, 2009 || Tzec Maun || L. Elenin || — || align=right | 1.3 km || 
|-id=391 bgcolor=#fefefe
| 269391 ||  || — || August 31, 2009 || Taunus || S. Karge, R. Kling || — || align=right | 1.2 km || 
|-id=392 bgcolor=#fefefe
| 269392 ||  || — || August 29, 2009 || Bergisch Gladbach || W. Bickel || — || align=right data-sort-value="0.85" | 850 m || 
|-id=393 bgcolor=#fefefe
| 269393 ||  || — || August 27, 2009 || Kitt Peak || Spacewatch || — || align=right | 3.1 km || 
|-id=394 bgcolor=#fefefe
| 269394 ||  || — || August 27, 2009 || Catalina || CSS || NYS || align=right data-sort-value="0.71" | 710 m || 
|-id=395 bgcolor=#fefefe
| 269395 ||  || — || August 26, 2009 || La Sagra || OAM Obs. || — || align=right data-sort-value="0.98" | 980 m || 
|-id=396 bgcolor=#E9E9E9
| 269396 ||  || — || August 18, 2009 || Catalina || CSS || — || align=right | 1.6 km || 
|-id=397 bgcolor=#E9E9E9
| 269397 || 2009 RB || — || September 2, 2009 || La Sagra || OAM Obs. || EUN || align=right | 2.5 km || 
|-id=398 bgcolor=#E9E9E9
| 269398 ||  || — || September 10, 2009 || La Sagra || OAM Obs. || ADE || align=right | 2.4 km || 
|-id=399 bgcolor=#fefefe
| 269399 ||  || — || September 14, 2009 || Catalina || CSS || V || align=right data-sort-value="0.85" | 850 m || 
|-id=400 bgcolor=#fefefe
| 269400 ||  || — || September 12, 2009 || Kitt Peak || Spacewatch || — || align=right data-sort-value="0.93" | 930 m || 
|}

269401–269500 

|-bgcolor=#d6d6d6
| 269401 ||  || — || September 12, 2009 || Kitt Peak || Spacewatch || — || align=right | 2.4 km || 
|-id=402 bgcolor=#fefefe
| 269402 ||  || — || September 12, 2009 || Kitt Peak || Spacewatch || NYS || align=right data-sort-value="0.97" | 970 m || 
|-id=403 bgcolor=#E9E9E9
| 269403 ||  || — || September 12, 2009 || Kitt Peak || Spacewatch || — || align=right | 1.6 km || 
|-id=404 bgcolor=#fefefe
| 269404 ||  || — || September 12, 2009 || Kitt Peak || Spacewatch || V || align=right data-sort-value="0.75" | 750 m || 
|-id=405 bgcolor=#fefefe
| 269405 ||  || — || September 12, 2009 || Kitt Peak || Spacewatch || — || align=right data-sort-value="0.80" | 800 m || 
|-id=406 bgcolor=#fefefe
| 269406 ||  || — || September 14, 2009 || Kitt Peak || Spacewatch || — || align=right | 1.4 km || 
|-id=407 bgcolor=#fefefe
| 269407 ||  || — || September 14, 2009 || Kitt Peak || Spacewatch || FLO || align=right data-sort-value="0.79" | 790 m || 
|-id=408 bgcolor=#d6d6d6
| 269408 ||  || — || September 15, 2009 || Kitt Peak || Spacewatch || — || align=right | 2.7 km || 
|-id=409 bgcolor=#E9E9E9
| 269409 ||  || — || September 15, 2009 || Kitt Peak || Spacewatch || — || align=right | 1.1 km || 
|-id=410 bgcolor=#d6d6d6
| 269410 ||  || — || September 15, 2009 || Kitt Peak || Spacewatch || — || align=right | 3.5 km || 
|-id=411 bgcolor=#E9E9E9
| 269411 ||  || — || September 15, 2009 || Kitt Peak || Spacewatch || — || align=right | 3.0 km || 
|-id=412 bgcolor=#fefefe
| 269412 ||  || — || September 15, 2009 || Kitt Peak || Spacewatch || — || align=right data-sort-value="0.96" | 960 m || 
|-id=413 bgcolor=#fefefe
| 269413 ||  || — || September 22, 2009 || Kachina || J. Hobart || MAS || align=right data-sort-value="0.75" | 750 m || 
|-id=414 bgcolor=#fefefe
| 269414 ||  || — || September 18, 2009 || Kitt Peak || Spacewatch || V || align=right data-sort-value="0.99" | 990 m || 
|-id=415 bgcolor=#d6d6d6
| 269415 ||  || — || September 16, 2009 || Kitt Peak || Spacewatch || — || align=right | 3.7 km || 
|-id=416 bgcolor=#E9E9E9
| 269416 ||  || — || September 16, 2009 || Kitt Peak || Spacewatch || — || align=right | 3.8 km || 
|-id=417 bgcolor=#E9E9E9
| 269417 ||  || — || September 16, 2009 || Kitt Peak || Spacewatch || — || align=right | 2.1 km || 
|-id=418 bgcolor=#fefefe
| 269418 ||  || — || September 17, 2009 || Kitt Peak || Spacewatch || NYS || align=right data-sort-value="0.95" | 950 m || 
|-id=419 bgcolor=#E9E9E9
| 269419 ||  || — || September 17, 2009 || Kitt Peak || Spacewatch || — || align=right | 3.0 km || 
|-id=420 bgcolor=#C2FFFF
| 269420 ||  || — || March 27, 2003 || Kitt Peak || Spacewatch || L4 || align=right | 13 km || 
|-id=421 bgcolor=#fefefe
| 269421 ||  || — || September 18, 2009 || Kitt Peak || Spacewatch || — || align=right | 1.0 km || 
|-id=422 bgcolor=#fefefe
| 269422 ||  || — || September 18, 2009 || Kitt Peak || Spacewatch || — || align=right | 1.0 km || 
|-id=423 bgcolor=#d6d6d6
| 269423 ||  || — || September 18, 2009 || Kitt Peak || Spacewatch || — || align=right | 2.3 km || 
|-id=424 bgcolor=#fefefe
| 269424 ||  || — || September 18, 2009 || Kitt Peak || Spacewatch || V || align=right data-sort-value="0.78" | 780 m || 
|-id=425 bgcolor=#E9E9E9
| 269425 ||  || — || September 18, 2009 || Kitt Peak || Spacewatch || — || align=right | 2.9 km || 
|-id=426 bgcolor=#fefefe
| 269426 ||  || — || September 18, 2009 || Kitt Peak || Spacewatch || — || align=right data-sort-value="0.89" | 890 m || 
|-id=427 bgcolor=#fefefe
| 269427 ||  || — || September 18, 2009 || Kitt Peak || Spacewatch || — || align=right data-sort-value="0.95" | 950 m || 
|-id=428 bgcolor=#E9E9E9
| 269428 ||  || — || September 18, 2009 || Kitt Peak || Spacewatch || — || align=right | 1.6 km || 
|-id=429 bgcolor=#fefefe
| 269429 ||  || — || September 18, 2009 || Kitt Peak || Spacewatch || — || align=right data-sort-value="0.80" | 800 m || 
|-id=430 bgcolor=#d6d6d6
| 269430 ||  || — || September 19, 2009 || Kitt Peak || Spacewatch || — || align=right | 3.3 km || 
|-id=431 bgcolor=#d6d6d6
| 269431 ||  || — || September 19, 2009 || Mount Lemmon || Mount Lemmon Survey || — || align=right | 4.9 km || 
|-id=432 bgcolor=#fefefe
| 269432 ||  || — || September 20, 2009 || Kitt Peak || Spacewatch || V || align=right data-sort-value="0.93" | 930 m || 
|-id=433 bgcolor=#fefefe
| 269433 ||  || — || September 21, 2009 || Mount Lemmon || Mount Lemmon Survey || MAS || align=right data-sort-value="0.86" | 860 m || 
|-id=434 bgcolor=#d6d6d6
| 269434 ||  || — || September 21, 2009 || Kitt Peak || Spacewatch || EOS || align=right | 2.7 km || 
|-id=435 bgcolor=#fefefe
| 269435 ||  || — || September 22, 2009 || Kitt Peak || Spacewatch || — || align=right data-sort-value="0.70" | 700 m || 
|-id=436 bgcolor=#fefefe
| 269436 ||  || — || September 18, 2009 || Purple Mountain || PMO NEO || — || align=right data-sort-value="0.88" | 880 m || 
|-id=437 bgcolor=#fefefe
| 269437 ||  || — || September 22, 2009 || Kitt Peak || Spacewatch || CLA || align=right | 1.7 km || 
|-id=438 bgcolor=#E9E9E9
| 269438 ||  || — || September 22, 2009 || Kitt Peak || Spacewatch || — || align=right | 2.0 km || 
|-id=439 bgcolor=#fefefe
| 269439 ||  || — || September 22, 2009 || Kitt Peak || Spacewatch || — || align=right data-sort-value="0.92" | 920 m || 
|-id=440 bgcolor=#fefefe
| 269440 ||  || — || September 23, 2009 || Kitt Peak || Spacewatch || — || align=right | 1.1 km || 
|-id=441 bgcolor=#fefefe
| 269441 ||  || — || September 23, 2009 || Kitt Peak || Spacewatch || — || align=right | 1.1 km || 
|-id=442 bgcolor=#fefefe
| 269442 ||  || — || September 24, 2009 || Mount Lemmon || Mount Lemmon Survey || — || align=right | 1.1 km || 
|-id=443 bgcolor=#d6d6d6
| 269443 ||  || — || September 25, 2009 || Kitt Peak || Spacewatch || BRA || align=right | 2.1 km || 
|-id=444 bgcolor=#d6d6d6
| 269444 ||  || — || September 16, 2009 || Mount Lemmon || Mount Lemmon Survey || TIR || align=right | 4.0 km || 
|-id=445 bgcolor=#fefefe
| 269445 ||  || — || September 23, 2009 || Mount Lemmon || Mount Lemmon Survey || — || align=right | 1.00 km || 
|-id=446 bgcolor=#fefefe
| 269446 ||  || — || June 17, 2005 || Mount Lemmon || Mount Lemmon Survey || V || align=right data-sort-value="0.90" | 900 m || 
|-id=447 bgcolor=#fefefe
| 269447 ||  || — || September 28, 2009 || Tzec Maun || Tzec Maun Obs. || — || align=right data-sort-value="0.91" | 910 m || 
|-id=448 bgcolor=#d6d6d6
| 269448 ||  || — || September 18, 2009 || Kitt Peak || Spacewatch || — || align=right | 2.6 km || 
|-id=449 bgcolor=#E9E9E9
| 269449 ||  || — || September 22, 2009 || Mount Lemmon || Mount Lemmon Survey || — || align=right | 2.4 km || 
|-id=450 bgcolor=#E9E9E9
| 269450 ||  || — || September 22, 2009 || Mount Lemmon || Mount Lemmon Survey || — || align=right | 3.1 km || 
|-id=451 bgcolor=#fefefe
| 269451 ||  || — || September 21, 2009 || Mount Lemmon || Mount Lemmon Survey || FLO || align=right data-sort-value="0.77" | 770 m || 
|-id=452 bgcolor=#d6d6d6
| 269452 ||  || — || September 23, 2009 || Mount Lemmon || Mount Lemmon Survey || — || align=right | 3.9 km || 
|-id=453 bgcolor=#fefefe
| 269453 ||  || — || September 24, 2009 || Kitt Peak || Spacewatch || V || align=right data-sort-value="0.91" | 910 m || 
|-id=454 bgcolor=#E9E9E9
| 269454 ||  || — || September 24, 2009 || Kitt Peak || Spacewatch || — || align=right | 2.5 km || 
|-id=455 bgcolor=#E9E9E9
| 269455 ||  || — || September 25, 2009 || Kitt Peak || Spacewatch || — || align=right | 1.9 km || 
|-id=456 bgcolor=#E9E9E9
| 269456 ||  || — || September 25, 2009 || Kitt Peak || Spacewatch || — || align=right | 2.9 km || 
|-id=457 bgcolor=#fefefe
| 269457 ||  || — || September 25, 2009 || Kitt Peak || Spacewatch || — || align=right data-sort-value="0.93" | 930 m || 
|-id=458 bgcolor=#E9E9E9
| 269458 ||  || — || September 28, 2009 || Mount Lemmon || Mount Lemmon Survey || MRX || align=right | 1.2 km || 
|-id=459 bgcolor=#fefefe
| 269459 ||  || — || September 25, 2009 || Catalina || CSS || NYS || align=right data-sort-value="0.70" | 700 m || 
|-id=460 bgcolor=#E9E9E9
| 269460 ||  || — || September 23, 2009 || Kitt Peak || Spacewatch || — || align=right | 1.3 km || 
|-id=461 bgcolor=#E9E9E9
| 269461 ||  || — || September 18, 2009 || Kitt Peak || Spacewatch || — || align=right | 1.4 km || 
|-id=462 bgcolor=#d6d6d6
| 269462 ||  || — || September 23, 2009 || Kitt Peak || Spacewatch || — || align=right | 2.1 km || 
|-id=463 bgcolor=#fefefe
| 269463 ||  || — || September 16, 2009 || Kitt Peak || Spacewatch || FLO || align=right data-sort-value="0.63" | 630 m || 
|-id=464 bgcolor=#C2FFFF
| 269464 ||  || — || September 24, 2009 || Catalina || CSS || L4 || align=right | 13 km || 
|-id=465 bgcolor=#d6d6d6
| 269465 ||  || — || September 22, 2009 || Mount Lemmon || Mount Lemmon Survey || — || align=right | 3.2 km || 
|-id=466 bgcolor=#fefefe
| 269466 ||  || — || September 16, 2009 || Mount Lemmon || Mount Lemmon Survey || — || align=right data-sort-value="0.93" | 930 m || 
|-id=467 bgcolor=#d6d6d6
| 269467 ||  || — || September 27, 2009 || Socorro || LINEAR || — || align=right | 2.9 km || 
|-id=468 bgcolor=#fefefe
| 269468 ||  || — || September 20, 2009 || Kitt Peak || Spacewatch || FLO || align=right data-sort-value="0.77" | 770 m || 
|-id=469 bgcolor=#d6d6d6
| 269469 ||  || — || October 15, 2009 || La Sagra || OAM Obs. || — || align=right | 3.3 km || 
|-id=470 bgcolor=#fefefe
| 269470 ||  || — || October 11, 2009 || Catalina || CSS || MAS || align=right data-sort-value="0.96" | 960 m || 
|-id=471 bgcolor=#E9E9E9
| 269471 ||  || — || October 12, 2009 || La Sagra || OAM Obs. || — || align=right | 2.4 km || 
|-id=472 bgcolor=#E9E9E9
| 269472 ||  || — || October 14, 2009 || Catalina || CSS || — || align=right | 2.2 km || 
|-id=473 bgcolor=#E9E9E9
| 269473 ||  || — || October 14, 2009 || Catalina || CSS || — || align=right | 3.0 km || 
|-id=474 bgcolor=#E9E9E9
| 269474 ||  || — || October 14, 2009 || La Sagra || OAM Obs. || — || align=right | 2.5 km || 
|-id=475 bgcolor=#d6d6d6
| 269475 ||  || — || October 14, 2009 || Catalina || CSS || — || align=right | 3.0 km || 
|-id=476 bgcolor=#d6d6d6
| 269476 ||  || — || October 12, 2009 || La Sagra || OAM Obs. || — || align=right | 2.4 km || 
|-id=477 bgcolor=#E9E9E9
| 269477 ||  || — || October 14, 2009 || La Sagra || OAM Obs. || — || align=right | 2.0 km || 
|-id=478 bgcolor=#E9E9E9
| 269478 ||  || — || October 14, 2009 || La Sagra || OAM Obs. || HNA || align=right | 3.3 km || 
|-id=479 bgcolor=#fefefe
| 269479 ||  || — || October 14, 2009 || Catalina || CSS || MAS || align=right data-sort-value="0.87" | 870 m || 
|-id=480 bgcolor=#d6d6d6
| 269480 ||  || — || October 15, 2009 || Catalina || CSS || — || align=right | 2.6 km || 
|-id=481 bgcolor=#d6d6d6
| 269481 ||  || — || October 12, 2009 || Mount Lemmon || Mount Lemmon Survey || — || align=right | 4.9 km || 
|-id=482 bgcolor=#d6d6d6
| 269482 ||  || — || October 12, 2009 || Mount Lemmon || Mount Lemmon Survey || — || align=right | 4.4 km || 
|-id=483 bgcolor=#fefefe
| 269483 ||  || — || October 14, 2009 || Mount Lemmon || Mount Lemmon Survey || — || align=right | 1.1 km || 
|-id=484 bgcolor=#E9E9E9
| 269484 Marcia ||  ||  || October 19, 2009 || Falera || J. De Queiroz || — || align=right | 2.6 km || 
|-id=485 bgcolor=#E9E9E9
| 269485 Bisikalo ||  ||  || October 21, 2009 || Zelenchukskaya || T. V. Kryachko || — || align=right | 4.8 km || 
|-id=486 bgcolor=#d6d6d6
| 269486 ||  || — || October 17, 2009 || La Sagra || OAM Obs. || — || align=right | 5.0 km || 
|-id=487 bgcolor=#E9E9E9
| 269487 ||  || — || October 20, 2009 || Mayhill || iTelescope Obs. || — || align=right | 1.3 km || 
|-id=488 bgcolor=#E9E9E9
| 269488 ||  || — || October 17, 2009 || Bisei SG Center || BATTeRS || AGN || align=right | 2.0 km || 
|-id=489 bgcolor=#d6d6d6
| 269489 ||  || — || October 22, 2009 || Bisei SG Center || BATTeRS || — || align=right | 3.3 km || 
|-id=490 bgcolor=#E9E9E9
| 269490 ||  || — || October 18, 2009 || La Sagra || OAM Obs. || — || align=right | 1.7 km || 
|-id=491 bgcolor=#E9E9E9
| 269491 ||  || — || October 20, 2009 || Socorro || LINEAR || — || align=right | 2.1 km || 
|-id=492 bgcolor=#d6d6d6
| 269492 ||  || — || October 18, 2009 || Mount Lemmon || Mount Lemmon Survey || THM || align=right | 2.7 km || 
|-id=493 bgcolor=#d6d6d6
| 269493 ||  || — || October 18, 2009 || Mount Lemmon || Mount Lemmon Survey || — || align=right | 4.7 km || 
|-id=494 bgcolor=#d6d6d6
| 269494 ||  || — || October 18, 2009 || Mount Lemmon || Mount Lemmon Survey || — || align=right | 4.3 km || 
|-id=495 bgcolor=#d6d6d6
| 269495 ||  || — || October 18, 2009 || Mount Lemmon || Mount Lemmon Survey || THM || align=right | 3.1 km || 
|-id=496 bgcolor=#d6d6d6
| 269496 ||  || — || October 21, 2009 || Mount Lemmon || Mount Lemmon Survey || — || align=right | 3.5 km || 
|-id=497 bgcolor=#E9E9E9
| 269497 ||  || — || October 22, 2009 || Mount Lemmon || Mount Lemmon Survey || WIT || align=right | 1.1 km || 
|-id=498 bgcolor=#E9E9E9
| 269498 ||  || — || October 22, 2009 || Mount Lemmon || Mount Lemmon Survey || — || align=right | 1.6 km || 
|-id=499 bgcolor=#E9E9E9
| 269499 ||  || — || October 22, 2009 || Catalina || CSS || — || align=right | 2.6 km || 
|-id=500 bgcolor=#fefefe
| 269500 ||  || — || October 23, 2009 || Kitt Peak || Spacewatch || NYS || align=right data-sort-value="0.82" | 820 m || 
|}

269501–269600 

|-bgcolor=#d6d6d6
| 269501 ||  || — || October 23, 2009 || Mount Lemmon || Mount Lemmon Survey || — || align=right | 5.6 km || 
|-id=502 bgcolor=#d6d6d6
| 269502 ||  || — || October 23, 2009 || Kitt Peak || Spacewatch || — || align=right | 5.1 km || 
|-id=503 bgcolor=#E9E9E9
| 269503 ||  || — || October 22, 2009 || Catalina || CSS || — || align=right | 1.8 km || 
|-id=504 bgcolor=#d6d6d6
| 269504 ||  || — || October 22, 2009 || Catalina || CSS || — || align=right | 2.7 km || 
|-id=505 bgcolor=#E9E9E9
| 269505 ||  || — || October 24, 2009 || Catalina || CSS || — || align=right | 1.2 km || 
|-id=506 bgcolor=#d6d6d6
| 269506 ||  || — || October 17, 2009 || La Sagra || OAM Obs. || — || align=right | 3.5 km || 
|-id=507 bgcolor=#fefefe
| 269507 ||  || — || October 18, 2009 || Catalina || CSS || SUL || align=right | 3.1 km || 
|-id=508 bgcolor=#E9E9E9
| 269508 ||  || — || October 22, 2009 || Mount Lemmon || Mount Lemmon Survey || — || align=right | 1.3 km || 
|-id=509 bgcolor=#d6d6d6
| 269509 ||  || — || October 23, 2009 || Mount Lemmon || Mount Lemmon Survey || SHU3:2 || align=right | 5.6 km || 
|-id=510 bgcolor=#d6d6d6
| 269510 ||  || — || October 23, 2009 || Mount Lemmon || Mount Lemmon Survey || — || align=right | 2.7 km || 
|-id=511 bgcolor=#d6d6d6
| 269511 ||  || — || October 23, 2009 || Kitt Peak || Spacewatch || KOR || align=right | 1.7 km || 
|-id=512 bgcolor=#d6d6d6
| 269512 ||  || — || October 23, 2009 || Kitt Peak || Spacewatch || — || align=right | 3.3 km || 
|-id=513 bgcolor=#E9E9E9
| 269513 ||  || — || October 23, 2009 || Mount Lemmon || Mount Lemmon Survey || PAD || align=right | 3.0 km || 
|-id=514 bgcolor=#E9E9E9
| 269514 ||  || — || October 23, 2009 || Kitt Peak || Spacewatch || HOF || align=right | 3.4 km || 
|-id=515 bgcolor=#fefefe
| 269515 ||  || — || October 21, 2009 || Mount Lemmon || Mount Lemmon Survey || V || align=right data-sort-value="0.67" | 670 m || 
|-id=516 bgcolor=#d6d6d6
| 269516 ||  || — || October 26, 2009 || La Sagra || OAM Obs. || — || align=right | 4.9 km || 
|-id=517 bgcolor=#d6d6d6
| 269517 ||  || — || October 28, 2009 || La Sagra || OAM Obs. || TIR || align=right | 6.5 km || 
|-id=518 bgcolor=#d6d6d6
| 269518 ||  || — || October 16, 2009 || Catalina || CSS || TIR || align=right | 2.4 km || 
|-id=519 bgcolor=#E9E9E9
| 269519 ||  || — || October 23, 2009 || Kitt Peak || Spacewatch || — || align=right | 1.9 km || 
|-id=520 bgcolor=#E9E9E9
| 269520 ||  || — || October 26, 2009 || Mount Lemmon || Mount Lemmon Survey || — || align=right | 1.2 km || 
|-id=521 bgcolor=#fefefe
| 269521 ||  || — || October 17, 2009 || Mount Lemmon || Mount Lemmon Survey || — || align=right | 1.2 km || 
|-id=522 bgcolor=#d6d6d6
| 269522 ||  || — || October 27, 2009 || Mount Lemmon || Mount Lemmon Survey || 3:2 || align=right | 4.4 km || 
|-id=523 bgcolor=#d6d6d6
| 269523 ||  || — || November 8, 2009 || Catalina || CSS || — || align=right | 5.5 km || 
|-id=524 bgcolor=#d6d6d6
| 269524 ||  || — || November 8, 2009 || Mount Lemmon || Mount Lemmon Survey || 7:4 || align=right | 6.1 km || 
|-id=525 bgcolor=#d6d6d6
| 269525 ||  || — || November 8, 2009 || Kitt Peak || Spacewatch || SHU3:2 || align=right | 4.2 km || 
|-id=526 bgcolor=#E9E9E9
| 269526 ||  || — || November 9, 2009 || Catalina || CSS || — || align=right | 2.0 km || 
|-id=527 bgcolor=#d6d6d6
| 269527 ||  || — || November 9, 2009 || Kitt Peak || Spacewatch || — || align=right | 4.0 km || 
|-id=528 bgcolor=#E9E9E9
| 269528 ||  || — || November 15, 2009 || Mayhill || iTelescope Obs. || MAR || align=right | 1.9 km || 
|-id=529 bgcolor=#E9E9E9
| 269529 ||  || — || November 9, 2009 || Mount Lemmon || Mount Lemmon Survey || — || align=right data-sort-value="0.95" | 950 m || 
|-id=530 bgcolor=#d6d6d6
| 269530 ||  || — || November 10, 2009 || Catalina || CSS || EUP || align=right | 6.4 km || 
|-id=531 bgcolor=#d6d6d6
| 269531 ||  || — || November 9, 2009 || Kitt Peak || Spacewatch || — || align=right | 2.6 km || 
|-id=532 bgcolor=#d6d6d6
| 269532 ||  || — || November 9, 2009 || Kitt Peak || Spacewatch || VER || align=right | 4.4 km || 
|-id=533 bgcolor=#d6d6d6
| 269533 ||  || — || November 9, 2009 || Mount Lemmon || Mount Lemmon Survey || KOR || align=right | 1.4 km || 
|-id=534 bgcolor=#fefefe
| 269534 ||  || — || November 8, 2009 || Kitt Peak || Spacewatch || — || align=right | 1.1 km || 
|-id=535 bgcolor=#E9E9E9
| 269535 ||  || — || November 8, 2009 || Kitt Peak || Spacewatch || — || align=right | 3.4 km || 
|-id=536 bgcolor=#E9E9E9
| 269536 ||  || — || November 9, 2009 || Kitt Peak || Spacewatch || — || align=right | 3.4 km || 
|-id=537 bgcolor=#E9E9E9
| 269537 ||  || — || November 9, 2009 || Kitt Peak || Spacewatch || MRX || align=right | 1.4 km || 
|-id=538 bgcolor=#fefefe
| 269538 ||  || — || November 10, 2009 || Kitt Peak || Spacewatch || — || align=right | 1.0 km || 
|-id=539 bgcolor=#d6d6d6
| 269539 ||  || — || November 12, 2009 || La Sagra || OAM Obs. || — || align=right | 3.6 km || 
|-id=540 bgcolor=#d6d6d6
| 269540 ||  || — || November 8, 2009 || Mount Lemmon || Mount Lemmon Survey || — || align=right | 3.7 km || 
|-id=541 bgcolor=#E9E9E9
| 269541 ||  || — || November 11, 2009 || Mount Lemmon || Mount Lemmon Survey || — || align=right data-sort-value="0.98" | 980 m || 
|-id=542 bgcolor=#d6d6d6
| 269542 ||  || — || November 8, 2009 || Kitt Peak || Spacewatch || — || align=right | 2.9 km || 
|-id=543 bgcolor=#d6d6d6
| 269543 ||  || — || November 10, 2009 || Kitt Peak || Spacewatch || — || align=right | 3.4 km || 
|-id=544 bgcolor=#E9E9E9
| 269544 ||  || — || November 15, 2009 || Catalina || CSS || WIT || align=right | 1.3 km || 
|-id=545 bgcolor=#d6d6d6
| 269545 ||  || — || November 11, 2009 || Catalina || CSS || — || align=right | 3.1 km || 
|-id=546 bgcolor=#d6d6d6
| 269546 ||  || — || November 8, 2009 || Kitt Peak || Spacewatch || 7:4 || align=right | 7.0 km || 
|-id=547 bgcolor=#d6d6d6
| 269547 ||  || — || November 11, 2009 || La Sagra || OAM Obs. || — || align=right | 2.8 km || 
|-id=548 bgcolor=#E9E9E9
| 269548 Fratyu || 2009 WR ||  || November 16, 2009 || Plana || F. Fratev || — || align=right | 2.2 km || 
|-id=549 bgcolor=#C2FFFF
| 269549 ||  || — || December 12, 1999 || Kitt Peak || Spacewatch || L4 || align=right | 10 km || 
|-id=550 bgcolor=#E9E9E9
| 269550 Chur ||  ||  || November 16, 2009 || Falera || J. De Queiroz || — || align=right | 2.9 km || 
|-id=551 bgcolor=#E9E9E9
| 269551 ||  || — || November 19, 2009 || Vail-Jarnac || Jarnac Obs. || — || align=right | 2.8 km || 
|-id=552 bgcolor=#d6d6d6
| 269552 ||  || — || November 16, 2009 || Mount Lemmon || Mount Lemmon Survey || — || align=right | 4.0 km || 
|-id=553 bgcolor=#fefefe
| 269553 ||  || — || November 16, 2009 || La Sagra || OAM Obs. || — || align=right | 1.2 km || 
|-id=554 bgcolor=#d6d6d6
| 269554 ||  || — || November 21, 2009 || Calvin-Rehoboth || L. A. Molnar || — || align=right | 2.8 km || 
|-id=555 bgcolor=#E9E9E9
| 269555 ||  || — || November 16, 2009 || Kitt Peak || Spacewatch || — || align=right | 1.6 km || 
|-id=556 bgcolor=#d6d6d6
| 269556 ||  || — || November 16, 2009 || Kitt Peak || Spacewatch || — || align=right | 3.8 km || 
|-id=557 bgcolor=#d6d6d6
| 269557 ||  || — || November 16, 2009 || Kitt Peak || Spacewatch || THM || align=right | 2.5 km || 
|-id=558 bgcolor=#d6d6d6
| 269558 ||  || — || March 25, 2006 || Kitt Peak || Spacewatch || — || align=right | 3.7 km || 
|-id=559 bgcolor=#d6d6d6
| 269559 ||  || — || November 18, 2009 || Mount Lemmon || Mount Lemmon Survey || EOS || align=right | 3.3 km || 
|-id=560 bgcolor=#d6d6d6
| 269560 ||  || — || November 19, 2009 || La Sagra || OAM Obs. || — || align=right | 5.1 km || 
|-id=561 bgcolor=#E9E9E9
| 269561 ||  || — || January 5, 2006 || Kitt Peak || Spacewatch || HOF || align=right | 3.2 km || 
|-id=562 bgcolor=#E9E9E9
| 269562 ||  || — || November 17, 2009 || Mount Lemmon || Mount Lemmon Survey || — || align=right | 2.7 km || 
|-id=563 bgcolor=#d6d6d6
| 269563 ||  || — || November 18, 2009 || Kitt Peak || Spacewatch || — || align=right | 3.1 km || 
|-id=564 bgcolor=#d6d6d6
| 269564 ||  || — || November 18, 2009 || Kitt Peak || Spacewatch || THM || align=right | 3.8 km || 
|-id=565 bgcolor=#d6d6d6
| 269565 ||  || — || November 19, 2009 || Kitt Peak || Spacewatch || — || align=right | 4.2 km || 
|-id=566 bgcolor=#d6d6d6
| 269566 ||  || — || November 19, 2009 || Kitt Peak || Spacewatch || — || align=right | 5.1 km || 
|-id=567 bgcolor=#E9E9E9
| 269567 Bakhtinov ||  ||  || November 24, 2009 || Tzec Maun || V. Nevski || — || align=right | 2.3 km || 
|-id=568 bgcolor=#d6d6d6
| 269568 ||  || — || November 25, 2009 || Tzec Maun || D. Chestnov, A. Novichonok || HYG || align=right | 4.5 km || 
|-id=569 bgcolor=#d6d6d6
| 269569 ||  || — || November 20, 2009 || Kitt Peak || Spacewatch || KOR || align=right | 1.6 km || 
|-id=570 bgcolor=#E9E9E9
| 269570 ||  || — || November 20, 2009 || Kitt Peak || Spacewatch || AST || align=right | 2.0 km || 
|-id=571 bgcolor=#E9E9E9
| 269571 ||  || — || November 21, 2009 || Kitt Peak || Spacewatch || — || align=right | 3.1 km || 
|-id=572 bgcolor=#d6d6d6
| 269572 ||  || — || November 23, 2009 || Kitt Peak || Spacewatch || HYG || align=right | 3.0 km || 
|-id=573 bgcolor=#E9E9E9
| 269573 ||  || — || November 23, 2009 || Kitt Peak || Spacewatch || — || align=right | 3.3 km || 
|-id=574 bgcolor=#E9E9E9
| 269574 ||  || — || November 23, 2009 || Kitt Peak || Spacewatch || WIT || align=right | 1.7 km || 
|-id=575 bgcolor=#E9E9E9
| 269575 ||  || — || November 25, 2009 || Mount Lemmon || Mount Lemmon Survey || — || align=right | 2.6 km || 
|-id=576 bgcolor=#d6d6d6
| 269576 ||  || — || November 26, 2009 || Mount Lemmon || Mount Lemmon Survey || 3:2 || align=right | 5.0 km || 
|-id=577 bgcolor=#E9E9E9
| 269577 ||  || — || November 26, 2009 || Mount Lemmon || Mount Lemmon Survey || PAD || align=right | 2.5 km || 
|-id=578 bgcolor=#d6d6d6
| 269578 ||  || — || November 16, 2009 || Kitt Peak || Spacewatch || — || align=right | 2.7 km || 
|-id=579 bgcolor=#E9E9E9
| 269579 ||  || — || November 17, 2009 || Kitt Peak || Spacewatch || HOF || align=right | 3.1 km || 
|-id=580 bgcolor=#E9E9E9
| 269580 ||  || — || November 26, 2009 || Catalina || CSS || MIT || align=right | 3.3 km || 
|-id=581 bgcolor=#d6d6d6
| 269581 ||  || — || November 16, 2009 || Mount Lemmon || Mount Lemmon Survey || — || align=right | 3.0 km || 
|-id=582 bgcolor=#E9E9E9
| 269582 ||  || — || November 16, 2009 || Mount Lemmon || Mount Lemmon Survey || HOF || align=right | 3.1 km || 
|-id=583 bgcolor=#d6d6d6
| 269583 ||  || — || November 17, 2009 || Kitt Peak || Spacewatch || — || align=right | 2.9 km || 
|-id=584 bgcolor=#d6d6d6
| 269584 ||  || — || November 24, 2009 || Kitt Peak || Spacewatch || — || align=right | 3.6 km || 
|-id=585 bgcolor=#E9E9E9
| 269585 ||  || — || November 27, 2009 || Mount Lemmon || Mount Lemmon Survey || — || align=right | 3.0 km || 
|-id=586 bgcolor=#E9E9E9
| 269586 ||  || — || November 17, 2009 || Kitt Peak || Spacewatch || HOF || align=right | 3.6 km || 
|-id=587 bgcolor=#d6d6d6
| 269587 ||  || — || November 21, 2009 || Kitt Peak || Spacewatch || — || align=right | 3.5 km || 
|-id=588 bgcolor=#d6d6d6
| 269588 ||  || — || November 21, 2009 || Kitt Peak || Spacewatch || KOR || align=right | 1.7 km || 
|-id=589 bgcolor=#d6d6d6
| 269589 Kryachko ||  ||  || December 10, 2009 || Tzec Maun || V. Nevski || EOS || align=right | 2.8 km || 
|-id=590 bgcolor=#d6d6d6
| 269590 ||  || — || December 10, 2009 || Mount Lemmon || Mount Lemmon Survey || THM || align=right | 2.5 km || 
|-id=591 bgcolor=#E9E9E9
| 269591 ||  || — || December 12, 2009 || La Sagra || OAM Obs. || — || align=right | 2.3 km || 
|-id=592 bgcolor=#E9E9E9
| 269592 ||  || — || April 8, 2002 || Kitt Peak || Spacewatch || — || align=right | 2.4 km || 
|-id=593 bgcolor=#d6d6d6
| 269593 ||  || — || December 17, 2009 || Mount Lemmon || Mount Lemmon Survey || VER || align=right | 6.3 km || 
|-id=594 bgcolor=#d6d6d6
| 269594 ||  || — || January 7, 2010 || Kitt Peak || Spacewatch || — || align=right | 5.2 km || 
|-id=595 bgcolor=#E9E9E9
| 269595 ||  || — || January 12, 2010 || Kitt Peak || Spacewatch || — || align=right | 3.1 km || 
|-id=596 bgcolor=#E9E9E9
| 269596 ||  || — || January 9, 2010 || WISE || WISE || — || align=right | 4.4 km || 
|-id=597 bgcolor=#d6d6d6
| 269597 ||  || — || January 12, 2010 || WISE || WISE || — || align=right | 3.9 km || 
|-id=598 bgcolor=#d6d6d6
| 269598 ||  || — || December 3, 2004 || Kitt Peak || Spacewatch || — || align=right | 4.7 km || 
|-id=599 bgcolor=#E9E9E9
| 269599 ||  || — || January 25, 2010 || WISE || WISE || — || align=right | 3.4 km || 
|-id=600 bgcolor=#d6d6d6
| 269600 ||  || — || November 3, 2004 || Catalina || CSS || — || align=right | 5.1 km || 
|}

269601–269700 

|-bgcolor=#E9E9E9
| 269601 ||  || — || February 5, 2010 || Catalina || CSS || — || align=right | 3.1 km || 
|-id=602 bgcolor=#E9E9E9
| 269602 ||  || — || February 6, 2010 || Mount Lemmon || Mount Lemmon Survey || — || align=right | 2.4 km || 
|-id=603 bgcolor=#d6d6d6
| 269603 ||  || — || February 9, 2010 || Catalina || CSS || — || align=right | 4.7 km || 
|-id=604 bgcolor=#fefefe
| 269604 ||  || — || February 9, 2010 || Kitt Peak || Spacewatch || — || align=right | 1.2 km || 
|-id=605 bgcolor=#d6d6d6
| 269605 ||  || — || February 9, 2010 || Kitt Peak || Spacewatch || — || align=right | 4.5 km || 
|-id=606 bgcolor=#d6d6d6
| 269606 ||  || — || February 14, 2010 || WISE || WISE || — || align=right | 4.6 km || 
|-id=607 bgcolor=#E9E9E9
| 269607 ||  || — || February 14, 2010 || Mount Lemmon || Mount Lemmon Survey || — || align=right | 1.2 km || 
|-id=608 bgcolor=#d6d6d6
| 269608 ||  || — || February 14, 2010 || Catalina || CSS || — || align=right | 4.2 km || 
|-id=609 bgcolor=#d6d6d6
| 269609 ||  || — || February 9, 2010 || Kitt Peak || Spacewatch || — || align=right | 4.0 km || 
|-id=610 bgcolor=#d6d6d6
| 269610 ||  || — || February 9, 2010 || Kitt Peak || Spacewatch || — || align=right | 3.4 km || 
|-id=611 bgcolor=#d6d6d6
| 269611 ||  || — || January 11, 2003 || Kitt Peak || Spacewatch || SHU3:2 || align=right | 4.6 km || 
|-id=612 bgcolor=#d6d6d6
| 269612 ||  || — || February 14, 2010 || WISE || WISE || — || align=right | 5.0 km || 
|-id=613 bgcolor=#E9E9E9
| 269613 ||  || — || February 17, 2010 || WISE || WISE || — || align=right | 3.6 km || 
|-id=614 bgcolor=#d6d6d6
| 269614 ||  || — || February 22, 2010 || WISE || WISE || — || align=right | 4.7 km || 
|-id=615 bgcolor=#E9E9E9
| 269615 ||  || — || February 18, 2010 || Mount Lemmon || Mount Lemmon Survey || — || align=right | 2.7 km || 
|-id=616 bgcolor=#fefefe
| 269616 ||  || — || March 4, 2010 || Kitt Peak || Spacewatch || NYS || align=right | 2.5 km || 
|-id=617 bgcolor=#d6d6d6
| 269617 ||  || — || May 14, 2010 || Kitt Peak || Spacewatch || — || align=right | 5.3 km || 
|-id=618 bgcolor=#fefefe
| 269618 ||  || — || May 18, 2010 || La Sagra || OAM Obs. || — || align=right | 1.3 km || 
|-id=619 bgcolor=#d6d6d6
| 269619 ||  || — || May 13, 2007 || Mount Lemmon || Mount Lemmon Survey || — || align=right | 4.1 km || 
|-id=620 bgcolor=#C2FFFF
| 269620 ||  || — || September 5, 2008 || Kitt Peak || Spacewatch || L4 || align=right | 10 km || 
|-id=621 bgcolor=#C2FFFF
| 269621 ||  || — || March 10, 2002 || Palomar || NEAT || L4 || align=right | 18 km || 
|-id=622 bgcolor=#C2FFFF
| 269622 ||  || — || October 9, 2010 || Catalina || CSS || L4 || align=right | 15 km || 
|-id=623 bgcolor=#C2FFFF
| 269623 ||  || — || November 18, 1998 || Kitt Peak || M. W. Buie || L4 || align=right | 10 km || 
|-id=624 bgcolor=#d6d6d6
| 269624 ||  || — || December 20, 2004 || Mount Lemmon || Mount Lemmon Survey || 3:2 || align=right | 5.9 km || 
|-id=625 bgcolor=#E9E9E9
| 269625 ||  || — || December 18, 2001 || Socorro || LINEAR || — || align=right | 1.7 km || 
|-id=626 bgcolor=#d6d6d6
| 269626 ||  || — || December 6, 2000 || Kitt Peak || Spacewatch || — || align=right | 2.9 km || 
|-id=627 bgcolor=#d6d6d6
| 269627 ||  || — || December 18, 2004 || Kitt Peak || Spacewatch || — || align=right | 4.2 km || 
|-id=628 bgcolor=#E9E9E9
| 269628 ||  || — || January 31, 1997 || Prescott || P. G. Comba || CLO || align=right | 3.5 km || 
|-id=629 bgcolor=#d6d6d6
| 269629 ||  || — || January 23, 2006 || Kitt Peak || Spacewatch || — || align=right | 4.1 km || 
|-id=630 bgcolor=#d6d6d6
| 269630 ||  || — || February 26, 2006 || Anderson Mesa || LONEOS || ALA || align=right | 7.5 km || 
|-id=631 bgcolor=#FA8072
| 269631 ||  || — || January 15, 1997 || Campo Imperatore || CINEOS || — || align=right data-sort-value="0.83" | 830 m || 
|-id=632 bgcolor=#d6d6d6
| 269632 ||  || — || October 24, 2005 || Mauna Kea || A. Boattini || — || align=right | 3.4 km || 
|-id=633 bgcolor=#d6d6d6
| 269633 ||  || — || February 29, 2000 || Socorro || LINEAR || THM || align=right | 3.2 km || 
|-id=634 bgcolor=#fefefe
| 269634 ||  || — || March 6, 1994 || Kitt Peak || Spacewatch || — || align=right data-sort-value="0.75" | 750 m || 
|-id=635 bgcolor=#fefefe
| 269635 ||  || — || September 19, 1998 || Caussols || ODAS || — || align=right | 1.2 km || 
|-id=636 bgcolor=#d6d6d6
| 269636 ||  || — || October 15, 2004 || Mount Lemmon || Mount Lemmon Survey || — || align=right | 2.2 km || 
|-id=637 bgcolor=#E9E9E9
| 269637 ||  || — || January 10, 1997 || Kitt Peak || Spacewatch || — || align=right | 3.1 km || 
|-id=638 bgcolor=#E9E9E9
| 269638 ||  || — || November 6, 2005 || Mount Lemmon || Mount Lemmon Survey || — || align=right | 1.5 km || 
|-id=639 bgcolor=#d6d6d6
| 269639 ||  || — || September 14, 2004 || Anderson Mesa || LONEOS || — || align=right | 2.6 km || 
|-id=640 bgcolor=#d6d6d6
| 269640 ||  || — || February 3, 2000 || Socorro || LINEAR || — || align=right | 5.6 km || 
|-id=641 bgcolor=#fefefe
| 269641 || 4245 P-L || — || September 24, 1960 || Palomar || PLS || — || align=right | 1.7 km || 
|-id=642 bgcolor=#fefefe
| 269642 ||  || — || September 24, 1960 || Palomar || PLS || — || align=right | 1.0 km || 
|-id=643 bgcolor=#fefefe
| 269643 ||  || — || September 24, 1960 || Palomar || PLS || NYS || align=right data-sort-value="0.67" | 670 m || 
|-id=644 bgcolor=#d6d6d6
| 269644 ||  || — || October 16, 1977 || Palomar || PLS || — || align=right | 3.7 km || 
|-id=645 bgcolor=#d6d6d6
| 269645 ||  || — || November 4, 1991 || Kitt Peak || Spacewatch || — || align=right | 4.1 km || 
|-id=646 bgcolor=#E9E9E9
| 269646 ||  || — || November 4, 1991 || Kitt Peak || Spacewatch || ADE || align=right | 2.9 km || 
|-id=647 bgcolor=#fefefe
| 269647 ||  || — || April 27, 1992 || Kitt Peak || Spacewatch || V || align=right data-sort-value="0.96" | 960 m || 
|-id=648 bgcolor=#E9E9E9
| 269648 ||  || — || August 25, 1992 || Palomar || A. Lowe || — || align=right | 1.3 km || 
|-id=649 bgcolor=#fefefe
| 269649 ||  || — || January 22, 1993 || Kitt Peak || Spacewatch || — || align=right | 1.1 km || 
|-id=650 bgcolor=#E9E9E9
| 269650 ||  || — || April 6, 1994 || Kitt Peak || Spacewatch || RAF || align=right | 1.0 km || 
|-id=651 bgcolor=#E9E9E9
| 269651 ||  || — || April 12, 1994 || Kitt Peak || Spacewatch || BAR || align=right | 1.8 km || 
|-id=652 bgcolor=#E9E9E9
| 269652 ||  || — || August 12, 1994 || La Silla || E. W. Elst || — || align=right | 3.3 km || 
|-id=653 bgcolor=#fefefe
| 269653 ||  || — || September 12, 1994 || Kitt Peak || Spacewatch || FLO || align=right data-sort-value="0.68" | 680 m || 
|-id=654 bgcolor=#E9E9E9
| 269654 ||  || — || September 28, 1994 || Kitt Peak || Spacewatch || — || align=right | 2.5 km || 
|-id=655 bgcolor=#E9E9E9
| 269655 ||  || — || January 29, 1995 || Kitt Peak || Spacewatch || — || align=right data-sort-value="0.85" | 850 m || 
|-id=656 bgcolor=#fefefe
| 269656 ||  || — || February 1, 1995 || Kitt Peak || Spacewatch || — || align=right | 1.1 km || 
|-id=657 bgcolor=#d6d6d6
| 269657 ||  || — || March 23, 1995 || Kitt Peak || Spacewatch || — || align=right | 3.0 km || 
|-id=658 bgcolor=#d6d6d6
| 269658 ||  || — || March 23, 1995 || Kitt Peak || Spacewatch || — || align=right | 3.8 km || 
|-id=659 bgcolor=#E9E9E9
| 269659 ||  || — || March 23, 1995 || Kitt Peak || Spacewatch || — || align=right | 1.3 km || 
|-id=660 bgcolor=#d6d6d6
| 269660 ||  || — || April 6, 1995 || Kitt Peak || Spacewatch || — || align=right | 3.2 km || 
|-id=661 bgcolor=#d6d6d6
| 269661 ||  || — || June 22, 1995 || Kitt Peak || Spacewatch || — || align=right | 3.8 km || 
|-id=662 bgcolor=#d6d6d6
| 269662 ||  || — || June 23, 1995 || Kitt Peak || Spacewatch || — || align=right | 3.9 km || 
|-id=663 bgcolor=#d6d6d6
| 269663 ||  || — || June 30, 1995 || Kitt Peak || Spacewatch || — || align=right | 3.9 km || 
|-id=664 bgcolor=#fefefe
| 269664 ||  || — || July 22, 1995 || Kitt Peak || Spacewatch || — || align=right data-sort-value="0.98" | 980 m || 
|-id=665 bgcolor=#fefefe
| 269665 ||  || — || September 19, 1995 || Kitt Peak || Spacewatch || — || align=right data-sort-value="0.73" | 730 m || 
|-id=666 bgcolor=#E9E9E9
| 269666 ||  || — || September 20, 1995 || Kitt Peak || Spacewatch || — || align=right | 1.6 km || 
|-id=667 bgcolor=#d6d6d6
| 269667 ||  || — || September 24, 1995 || Kitt Peak || Spacewatch || THB || align=right | 4.8 km || 
|-id=668 bgcolor=#fefefe
| 269668 ||  || — || September 26, 1995 || Kitt Peak || Spacewatch || MAS || align=right data-sort-value="0.48" | 480 m || 
|-id=669 bgcolor=#E9E9E9
| 269669 ||  || — || September 26, 1995 || Kitt Peak || Spacewatch || HEN || align=right | 1.2 km || 
|-id=670 bgcolor=#E9E9E9
| 269670 ||  || — || September 20, 1995 || Kitt Peak || Spacewatch || — || align=right | 1.4 km || 
|-id=671 bgcolor=#E9E9E9
| 269671 ||  || — || September 30, 1995 || Kitt Peak || Spacewatch || — || align=right | 2.0 km || 
|-id=672 bgcolor=#E9E9E9
| 269672 ||  || — || October 17, 1995 || Kitt Peak || Spacewatch || HOF || align=right | 2.7 km || 
|-id=673 bgcolor=#fefefe
| 269673 ||  || — || October 19, 1995 || Kitt Peak || Spacewatch || NYS || align=right data-sort-value="0.87" | 870 m || 
|-id=674 bgcolor=#E9E9E9
| 269674 ||  || — || October 19, 1995 || Kitt Peak || Spacewatch || — || align=right | 1.6 km || 
|-id=675 bgcolor=#fefefe
| 269675 ||  || — || October 25, 1995 || Kitt Peak || Spacewatch || V || align=right data-sort-value="0.88" | 880 m || 
|-id=676 bgcolor=#fefefe
| 269676 ||  || — || October 24, 1995 || Kitt Peak || Spacewatch || — || align=right data-sort-value="0.94" | 940 m || 
|-id=677 bgcolor=#E9E9E9
| 269677 ||  || — || October 27, 1995 || Kitt Peak || Spacewatch || MAR || align=right | 1.6 km || 
|-id=678 bgcolor=#E9E9E9
| 269678 ||  || — || October 24, 1995 || Kitt Peak || Spacewatch || — || align=right | 3.2 km || 
|-id=679 bgcolor=#fefefe
| 269679 ||  || — || November 14, 1995 || Kitt Peak || Spacewatch || — || align=right | 1.1 km || 
|-id=680 bgcolor=#fefefe
| 269680 ||  || — || November 16, 1995 || Kitt Peak || Spacewatch || — || align=right | 1.2 km || 
|-id=681 bgcolor=#fefefe
| 269681 ||  || — || November 16, 1995 || Kitt Peak || Spacewatch || — || align=right | 2.3 km || 
|-id=682 bgcolor=#fefefe
| 269682 ||  || — || November 17, 1995 || Kitt Peak || Spacewatch || NYS || align=right data-sort-value="0.63" | 630 m || 
|-id=683 bgcolor=#fefefe
| 269683 ||  || — || November 20, 1995 || Kitt Peak || Spacewatch || — || align=right data-sort-value="0.90" | 900 m || 
|-id=684 bgcolor=#E9E9E9
| 269684 ||  || — || December 22, 1995 || Kitt Peak || Spacewatch || JUN || align=right | 1.8 km || 
|-id=685 bgcolor=#fefefe
| 269685 ||  || — || January 24, 1996 || Kitt Peak || Spacewatch || — || align=right data-sort-value="0.94" | 940 m || 
|-id=686 bgcolor=#d6d6d6
| 269686 ||  || — || March 12, 1996 || Kitt Peak || Spacewatch || — || align=right | 3.8 km || 
|-id=687 bgcolor=#fefefe
| 269687 ||  || — || April 12, 1996 || Kitt Peak || Spacewatch || NYS || align=right data-sort-value="0.96" | 960 m || 
|-id=688 bgcolor=#fefefe
| 269688 ||  || — || May 15, 1996 || Kitt Peak || Spacewatch || V || align=right data-sort-value="0.87" | 870 m || 
|-id=689 bgcolor=#fefefe
| 269689 ||  || — || June 8, 1996 || Kitt Peak || Spacewatch || V || align=right data-sort-value="0.99" | 990 m || 
|-id=690 bgcolor=#FFC2E0
| 269690 ||  || — || September 14, 1996 || Kitt Peak || Spacewatch || APOPHA || align=right data-sort-value="0.89" | 890 m || 
|-id=691 bgcolor=#E9E9E9
| 269691 ||  || — || September 5, 1996 || Kitt Peak || Spacewatch || — || align=right | 1.9 km || 
|-id=692 bgcolor=#d6d6d6
| 269692 ||  || — || October 4, 1996 || Kitt Peak || Spacewatch || — || align=right | 3.5 km || 
|-id=693 bgcolor=#fefefe
| 269693 ||  || — || October 8, 1996 || Kitt Peak || Spacewatch || H || align=right data-sort-value="0.82" | 820 m || 
|-id=694 bgcolor=#fefefe
| 269694 ||  || — || October 31, 1996 || Prescott || P. G. Comba || H || align=right data-sort-value="0.79" | 790 m || 
|-id=695 bgcolor=#fefefe
| 269695 ||  || — || November 6, 1996 || Stroncone || A. Vagnozzi || FLO || align=right data-sort-value="0.73" | 730 m || 
|-id=696 bgcolor=#E9E9E9
| 269696 ||  || — || April 3, 1997 || Socorro || LINEAR || — || align=right | 2.7 km || 
|-id=697 bgcolor=#fefefe
| 269697 ||  || — || April 30, 1997 || Socorro || LINEAR || — || align=right data-sort-value="0.91" | 910 m || 
|-id=698 bgcolor=#d6d6d6
| 269698 ||  || — || June 27, 1997 || Kitt Peak || Spacewatch || — || align=right | 3.5 km || 
|-id=699 bgcolor=#fefefe
| 269699 ||  || — || July 3, 1997 || Kitt Peak || Spacewatch || — || align=right | 1.2 km || 
|-id=700 bgcolor=#d6d6d6
| 269700 ||  || — || August 12, 1997 || Pises || Pises Obs. || EOS || align=right | 2.3 km || 
|}

269701–269800 

|-bgcolor=#d6d6d6
| 269701 ||  || — || October 3, 1997 || Kitt Peak || Spacewatch || — || align=right | 4.0 km || 
|-id=702 bgcolor=#fefefe
| 269702 ||  || — || October 4, 1997 || Kitt Peak || Spacewatch || MAS || align=right data-sort-value="0.90" | 900 m || 
|-id=703 bgcolor=#fefefe
| 269703 ||  || — || October 23, 1997 || Ondřejov || L. Kotková || — || align=right | 1.4 km || 
|-id=704 bgcolor=#d6d6d6
| 269704 ||  || — || October 25, 1997 || Kitt Peak || Spacewatch || — || align=right | 4.4 km || 
|-id=705 bgcolor=#d6d6d6
| 269705 ||  || — || October 31, 1997 || Bergisch Gladbac || W. Bickel || EOS || align=right | 2.7 km || 
|-id=706 bgcolor=#fefefe
| 269706 ||  || — || November 23, 1997 || Chichibu || N. Satō || — || align=right | 1.9 km || 
|-id=707 bgcolor=#E9E9E9
| 269707 ||  || — || January 23, 1998 || Kitt Peak || Spacewatch || EUN || align=right | 1.6 km || 
|-id=708 bgcolor=#E9E9E9
| 269708 ||  || — || February 24, 1998 || Kitt Peak || Spacewatch || — || align=right | 2.2 km || 
|-id=709 bgcolor=#E9E9E9
| 269709 ||  || — || February 24, 1998 || Kitt Peak || Spacewatch || — || align=right | 1.1 km || 
|-id=710 bgcolor=#E9E9E9
| 269710 ||  || — || March 20, 1998 || Socorro || LINEAR || BAR || align=right | 1.7 km || 
|-id=711 bgcolor=#E9E9E9
| 269711 ||  || — || March 18, 1998 || Kitt Peak || Spacewatch || EUN || align=right | 1.1 km || 
|-id=712 bgcolor=#E9E9E9
| 269712 ||  || — || March 20, 1998 || Socorro || LINEAR || ADE || align=right | 3.5 km || 
|-id=713 bgcolor=#E9E9E9
| 269713 ||  || — || April 23, 1998 || Kitt Peak || Spacewatch || — || align=right | 1.8 km || 
|-id=714 bgcolor=#E9E9E9
| 269714 ||  || — || April 21, 1998 || Socorro || LINEAR || — || align=right | 2.2 km || 
|-id=715 bgcolor=#fefefe
| 269715 ||  || — || May 22, 1998 || Socorro || LINEAR || — || align=right | 1.2 km || 
|-id=716 bgcolor=#fefefe
| 269716 ||  || — || June 27, 1998 || Kitt Peak || Spacewatch || — || align=right data-sort-value="0.88" | 880 m || 
|-id=717 bgcolor=#fefefe
| 269717 ||  || — || August 17, 1998 || Socorro || LINEAR || — || align=right | 1.5 km || 
|-id=718 bgcolor=#fefefe
| 269718 ||  || — || August 17, 1998 || Socorro || LINEAR || — || align=right | 1.5 km || 
|-id=719 bgcolor=#FA8072
| 269719 ||  || — || August 28, 1998 || Socorro || LINEAR || — || align=right data-sort-value="0.82" | 820 m || 
|-id=720 bgcolor=#fefefe
| 269720 ||  || — || August 30, 1998 || Kitt Peak || Spacewatch || NYS || align=right data-sort-value="0.71" | 710 m || 
|-id=721 bgcolor=#fefefe
| 269721 ||  || — || August 19, 1998 || Socorro || LINEAR || — || align=right | 1.5 km || 
|-id=722 bgcolor=#fefefe
| 269722 ||  || — || September 14, 1998 || Socorro || LINEAR || PHO || align=right | 1.6 km || 
|-id=723 bgcolor=#fefefe
| 269723 ||  || — || September 13, 1998 || Kitt Peak || Spacewatch || NYS || align=right data-sort-value="0.67" | 670 m || 
|-id=724 bgcolor=#E9E9E9
| 269724 ||  || — || September 14, 1998 || Socorro || LINEAR || CLO || align=right | 3.2 km || 
|-id=725 bgcolor=#fefefe
| 269725 ||  || — || September 14, 1998 || Socorro || LINEAR || — || align=right data-sort-value="0.99" | 990 m || 
|-id=726 bgcolor=#d6d6d6
| 269726 ||  || — || September 14, 1998 || Socorro || LINEAR || Tj (2.94) || align=right | 6.1 km || 
|-id=727 bgcolor=#d6d6d6
| 269727 ||  || — || September 17, 1998 || Caussols || ODAS || CHA || align=right | 2.7 km || 
|-id=728 bgcolor=#fefefe
| 269728 ||  || — || September 18, 1998 || Kitt Peak || Spacewatch || FLO || align=right data-sort-value="0.93" | 930 m || 
|-id=729 bgcolor=#d6d6d6
| 269729 ||  || — || September 24, 1998 || Kitt Peak || Spacewatch || — || align=right | 2.5 km || 
|-id=730 bgcolor=#fefefe
| 269730 ||  || — || September 17, 1998 || Anderson Mesa || LONEOS || FLO || align=right data-sort-value="0.98" | 980 m || 
|-id=731 bgcolor=#fefefe
| 269731 ||  || — || September 26, 1998 || Xinglong || SCAP || — || align=right | 1.9 km || 
|-id=732 bgcolor=#fefefe
| 269732 ||  || — || September 26, 1998 || Socorro || LINEAR || NYS || align=right data-sort-value="0.73" | 730 m || 
|-id=733 bgcolor=#fefefe
| 269733 ||  || — || September 26, 1998 || Socorro || LINEAR || V || align=right data-sort-value="0.90" | 900 m || 
|-id=734 bgcolor=#fefefe
| 269734 ||  || — || September 26, 1998 || Socorro || LINEAR || V || align=right | 1.1 km || 
|-id=735 bgcolor=#fefefe
| 269735 ||  || — || September 26, 1998 || Socorro || LINEAR || — || align=right | 1.4 km || 
|-id=736 bgcolor=#fefefe
| 269736 ||  || — || September 26, 1998 || Socorro || LINEAR || NYS || align=right data-sort-value="0.80" | 800 m || 
|-id=737 bgcolor=#fefefe
| 269737 ||  || — || September 18, 1998 || Catalina || CSS || — || align=right | 1.1 km || 
|-id=738 bgcolor=#d6d6d6
| 269738 ||  || — || October 12, 1998 || Kitt Peak || Spacewatch || — || align=right | 3.1 km || 
|-id=739 bgcolor=#fefefe
| 269739 ||  || — || October 12, 1998 || Kitt Peak || Spacewatch || — || align=right data-sort-value="0.97" | 970 m || 
|-id=740 bgcolor=#d6d6d6
| 269740 ||  || — || October 15, 1998 || Xinglong || SCAP || — || align=right | 5.1 km || 
|-id=741 bgcolor=#fefefe
| 269741 ||  || — || October 17, 1998 || Xinglong || SCAP || NYS || align=right data-sort-value="0.77" | 770 m || 
|-id=742 bgcolor=#fefefe
| 269742 Kroónorbert ||  ||  || October 23, 1998 || Piszkéstető || L. Kiss, K. Sárneczky || FLO || align=right data-sort-value="0.81" | 810 m || 
|-id=743 bgcolor=#d6d6d6
| 269743 ||  || — || November 15, 1998 || Kitt Peak || Spacewatch || — || align=right | 3.0 km || 
|-id=744 bgcolor=#fefefe
| 269744 ||  || — || November 21, 1998 || Catalina || CSS || PHO || align=right | 1.8 km || 
|-id=745 bgcolor=#FA8072
| 269745 ||  || — || November 27, 1998 || Višnjan Observatory || K. Korlević || — || align=right | 1.7 km || 
|-id=746 bgcolor=#fefefe
| 269746 ||  || — || November 16, 1998 || Kitt Peak || Spacewatch || MAS || align=right data-sort-value="0.78" | 780 m || 
|-id=747 bgcolor=#d6d6d6
| 269747 ||  || — || November 23, 1998 || Kitt Peak || Spacewatch || THM || align=right | 2.4 km || 
|-id=748 bgcolor=#d6d6d6
| 269748 ||  || — || November 23, 1998 || Kitt Peak || Spacewatch || — || align=right | 2.5 km || 
|-id=749 bgcolor=#d6d6d6
| 269749 ||  || — || December 8, 1998 || Kitt Peak || Spacewatch || — || align=right | 4.4 km || 
|-id=750 bgcolor=#fefefe
| 269750 ||  || — || December 11, 1998 || Kitt Peak || Spacewatch || — || align=right | 1.3 km || 
|-id=751 bgcolor=#fefefe
| 269751 ||  || — || January 15, 1999 || Kitt Peak || Spacewatch || MAS || align=right data-sort-value="0.87" | 870 m || 
|-id=752 bgcolor=#d6d6d6
| 269752 ||  || — || January 19, 1999 || Kitt Peak || Spacewatch || — || align=right | 3.1 km || 
|-id=753 bgcolor=#E9E9E9
| 269753 ||  || — || September 7, 1999 || Socorro || LINEAR || ADE || align=right | 3.1 km || 
|-id=754 bgcolor=#E9E9E9
| 269754 ||  || — || September 8, 1999 || Socorro || LINEAR || — || align=right | 2.4 km || 
|-id=755 bgcolor=#E9E9E9
| 269755 ||  || — || September 9, 1999 || Socorro || LINEAR || — || align=right | 2.5 km || 
|-id=756 bgcolor=#E9E9E9
| 269756 ||  || — || September 9, 1999 || Socorro || LINEAR || — || align=right | 2.0 km || 
|-id=757 bgcolor=#E9E9E9
| 269757 ||  || — || September 9, 1999 || Socorro || LINEAR || — || align=right | 3.8 km || 
|-id=758 bgcolor=#fefefe
| 269758 ||  || — || September 4, 1999 || Catalina || CSS || FLO || align=right data-sort-value="0.58" | 580 m || 
|-id=759 bgcolor=#E9E9E9
| 269759 ||  || — || September 8, 1999 || Catalina || CSS || JUN || align=right | 1.9 km || 
|-id=760 bgcolor=#fefefe
| 269760 ||  || — || September 30, 1999 || Socorro || LINEAR || PHO || align=right | 2.9 km || 
|-id=761 bgcolor=#E9E9E9
| 269761 ||  || — || September 30, 1999 || Kitt Peak || Spacewatch || AGN || align=right | 1.5 km || 
|-id=762 bgcolor=#fefefe
| 269762 Nocentini ||  ||  || October 4, 1999 || Ceccano || G. Masi || — || align=right | 1.1 km || 
|-id=763 bgcolor=#E9E9E9
| 269763 ||  || — || October 4, 1999 || Socorro || LINEAR || — || align=right | 4.1 km || 
|-id=764 bgcolor=#E9E9E9
| 269764 ||  || — || October 3, 1999 || Catalina || CSS || POS || align=right | 4.1 km || 
|-id=765 bgcolor=#E9E9E9
| 269765 ||  || — || October 4, 1999 || Kitt Peak || Spacewatch || HOF || align=right | 3.3 km || 
|-id=766 bgcolor=#d6d6d6
| 269766 ||  || — || October 6, 1999 || Kitt Peak || Spacewatch || — || align=right | 4.8 km || 
|-id=767 bgcolor=#E9E9E9
| 269767 ||  || — || October 7, 1999 || Kitt Peak || Spacewatch || — || align=right | 3.2 km || 
|-id=768 bgcolor=#E9E9E9
| 269768 ||  || — || October 7, 1999 || Kitt Peak || Spacewatch || — || align=right | 2.3 km || 
|-id=769 bgcolor=#E9E9E9
| 269769 ||  || — || October 7, 1999 || Kitt Peak || Spacewatch || — || align=right | 2.3 km || 
|-id=770 bgcolor=#fefefe
| 269770 ||  || — || October 8, 1999 || Kitt Peak || Spacewatch || — || align=right data-sort-value="0.81" | 810 m || 
|-id=771 bgcolor=#E9E9E9
| 269771 ||  || — || October 9, 1999 || Kitt Peak || Spacewatch || — || align=right | 2.3 km || 
|-id=772 bgcolor=#E9E9E9
| 269772 ||  || — || October 10, 1999 || Kitt Peak || Spacewatch || AGN || align=right | 1.5 km || 
|-id=773 bgcolor=#d6d6d6
| 269773 ||  || — || October 15, 1999 || Kitt Peak || Spacewatch || KOR || align=right | 1.6 km || 
|-id=774 bgcolor=#d6d6d6
| 269774 ||  || — || October 2, 1999 || Socorro || LINEAR || — || align=right | 3.1 km || 
|-id=775 bgcolor=#E9E9E9
| 269775 ||  || — || October 4, 1999 || Socorro || LINEAR || — || align=right | 2.4 km || 
|-id=776 bgcolor=#fefefe
| 269776 ||  || — || October 4, 1999 || Socorro || LINEAR || — || align=right data-sort-value="0.77" | 770 m || 
|-id=777 bgcolor=#fefefe
| 269777 ||  || — || October 6, 1999 || Socorro || LINEAR || — || align=right data-sort-value="0.89" | 890 m || 
|-id=778 bgcolor=#E9E9E9
| 269778 ||  || — || October 6, 1999 || Socorro || LINEAR || — || align=right | 2.0 km || 
|-id=779 bgcolor=#fefefe
| 269779 ||  || — || October 6, 1999 || Socorro || LINEAR || — || align=right data-sort-value="0.81" | 810 m || 
|-id=780 bgcolor=#FA8072
| 269780 ||  || — || October 7, 1999 || Socorro || LINEAR || — || align=right data-sort-value="0.90" | 900 m || 
|-id=781 bgcolor=#E9E9E9
| 269781 ||  || — || October 7, 1999 || Socorro || LINEAR || EUN || align=right | 2.3 km || 
|-id=782 bgcolor=#fefefe
| 269782 ||  || — || October 7, 1999 || Socorro || LINEAR || — || align=right | 1.2 km || 
|-id=783 bgcolor=#fefefe
| 269783 ||  || — || October 11, 1999 || Socorro || LINEAR || — || align=right | 1.2 km || 
|-id=784 bgcolor=#E9E9E9
| 269784 ||  || — || October 15, 1999 || Socorro || LINEAR || — || align=right | 3.6 km || 
|-id=785 bgcolor=#E9E9E9
| 269785 ||  || — || October 15, 1999 || Socorro || LINEAR || — || align=right | 1.6 km || 
|-id=786 bgcolor=#E9E9E9
| 269786 ||  || — || October 6, 1999 || Socorro || LINEAR || — || align=right | 2.2 km || 
|-id=787 bgcolor=#E9E9E9
| 269787 ||  || — || October 4, 1999 || Kitt Peak || Spacewatch || AGN || align=right | 1.7 km || 
|-id=788 bgcolor=#E9E9E9
| 269788 ||  || — || October 9, 1999 || Socorro || LINEAR || — || align=right | 4.6 km || 
|-id=789 bgcolor=#E9E9E9
| 269789 ||  || — || October 12, 1999 || Kitt Peak || Spacewatch || — || align=right | 3.5 km || 
|-id=790 bgcolor=#d6d6d6
| 269790 ||  || — || October 3, 1999 || Socorro || LINEAR || — || align=right | 4.4 km || 
|-id=791 bgcolor=#E9E9E9
| 269791 ||  || — || October 9, 1999 || Kitt Peak || Spacewatch || HEN || align=right | 1.1 km || 
|-id=792 bgcolor=#E9E9E9
| 269792 ||  || — || October 8, 1999 || Catalina || CSS || — || align=right | 2.7 km || 
|-id=793 bgcolor=#E9E9E9
| 269793 ||  || — || October 13, 1999 || Apache Point || SDSS || AGN || align=right | 1.5 km || 
|-id=794 bgcolor=#fefefe
| 269794 ||  || — || October 31, 1999 || Kitt Peak || Spacewatch || — || align=right data-sort-value="0.94" | 940 m || 
|-id=795 bgcolor=#E9E9E9
| 269795 ||  || — || October 31, 1999 || Kitt Peak || Spacewatch || WAT || align=right | 3.0 km || 
|-id=796 bgcolor=#d6d6d6
| 269796 ||  || — || October 31, 1999 || Kitt Peak || Spacewatch || — || align=right | 3.3 km || 
|-id=797 bgcolor=#E9E9E9
| 269797 ||  || — || October 16, 1999 || Kitt Peak || Spacewatch || — || align=right | 3.5 km || 
|-id=798 bgcolor=#d6d6d6
| 269798 ||  || — || October 30, 1999 || Catalina || CSS || YAK || align=right | 3.8 km || 
|-id=799 bgcolor=#fefefe
| 269799 ||  || — || November 1, 1999 || Socorro || LINEAR || — || align=right | 1.4 km || 
|-id=800 bgcolor=#E9E9E9
| 269800 ||  || — || November 2, 1999 || Kitt Peak || Spacewatch || — || align=right | 3.8 km || 
|}

269801–269900 

|-bgcolor=#E9E9E9
| 269801 ||  || — || November 4, 1999 || Kitt Peak || Spacewatch || — || align=right | 2.6 km || 
|-id=802 bgcolor=#fefefe
| 269802 ||  || — || November 4, 1999 || Socorro || LINEAR || — || align=right data-sort-value="0.94" | 940 m || 
|-id=803 bgcolor=#E9E9E9
| 269803 ||  || — || November 5, 1999 || Socorro || LINEAR || — || align=right | 3.7 km || 
|-id=804 bgcolor=#E9E9E9
| 269804 ||  || — || November 6, 1999 || Kitt Peak || Spacewatch || AGN || align=right | 1.2 km || 
|-id=805 bgcolor=#fefefe
| 269805 ||  || — || November 4, 1999 || Socorro || LINEAR || H || align=right | 1.1 km || 
|-id=806 bgcolor=#FA8072
| 269806 ||  || — || November 9, 1999 || Socorro || LINEAR || — || align=right | 3.4 km || 
|-id=807 bgcolor=#fefefe
| 269807 ||  || — || November 9, 1999 || Socorro || LINEAR || — || align=right | 1.00 km || 
|-id=808 bgcolor=#fefefe
| 269808 ||  || — || November 9, 1999 || Socorro || LINEAR || — || align=right data-sort-value="0.91" | 910 m || 
|-id=809 bgcolor=#fefefe
| 269809 ||  || — || November 9, 1999 || Socorro || LINEAR || — || align=right | 1.0 km || 
|-id=810 bgcolor=#d6d6d6
| 269810 ||  || — || November 9, 1999 || Socorro || LINEAR || 615 || align=right | 2.2 km || 
|-id=811 bgcolor=#d6d6d6
| 269811 ||  || — || November 4, 1999 || Kitt Peak || Spacewatch || KOR || align=right | 1.7 km || 
|-id=812 bgcolor=#E9E9E9
| 269812 ||  || — || November 10, 1999 || Kitt Peak || Spacewatch || — || align=right | 1.6 km || 
|-id=813 bgcolor=#d6d6d6
| 269813 ||  || — || November 10, 1999 || Kitt Peak || Spacewatch || — || align=right | 3.5 km || 
|-id=814 bgcolor=#E9E9E9
| 269814 ||  || — || November 11, 1999 || Catalina || CSS || — || align=right | 4.1 km || 
|-id=815 bgcolor=#fefefe
| 269815 ||  || — || November 14, 1999 || Socorro || LINEAR || V || align=right data-sort-value="0.68" | 680 m || 
|-id=816 bgcolor=#E9E9E9
| 269816 ||  || — || November 7, 1999 || Socorro || LINEAR || — || align=right | 3.2 km || 
|-id=817 bgcolor=#fefefe
| 269817 ||  || — || November 3, 1999 || Socorro || LINEAR || — || align=right | 1.1 km || 
|-id=818 bgcolor=#d6d6d6
| 269818 ||  || — || November 12, 1999 || Socorro || LINEAR || — || align=right | 1.8 km || 
|-id=819 bgcolor=#d6d6d6
| 269819 ||  || — || November 13, 1999 || Anderson Mesa || LONEOS || — || align=right | 3.4 km || 
|-id=820 bgcolor=#E9E9E9
| 269820 ||  || — || November 30, 1999 || Kitt Peak || Spacewatch || — || align=right | 3.1 km || 
|-id=821 bgcolor=#fefefe
| 269821 ||  || — || December 4, 1999 || Catalina || CSS || PHO || align=right | 1.4 km || 
|-id=822 bgcolor=#E9E9E9
| 269822 ||  || — || December 9, 1999 || Kitt Peak || Spacewatch || — || align=right | 2.9 km || 
|-id=823 bgcolor=#d6d6d6
| 269823 ||  || — || December 12, 1999 || Kitt Peak || Spacewatch || — || align=right | 3.8 km || 
|-id=824 bgcolor=#d6d6d6
| 269824 ||  || — || January 2, 2000 || Kitt Peak || Spacewatch || — || align=right | 3.4 km || 
|-id=825 bgcolor=#d6d6d6
| 269825 ||  || — || January 5, 2000 || Kitt Peak || Spacewatch || — || align=right | 3.7 km || 
|-id=826 bgcolor=#d6d6d6
| 269826 ||  || — || January 4, 2000 || Socorro || LINEAR || — || align=right | 5.3 km || 
|-id=827 bgcolor=#fefefe
| 269827 ||  || — || January 3, 2000 || Socorro || LINEAR || — || align=right | 1.0 km || 
|-id=828 bgcolor=#d6d6d6
| 269828 ||  || — || January 3, 2000 || Kitt Peak || Spacewatch || LIX || align=right | 5.3 km || 
|-id=829 bgcolor=#d6d6d6
| 269829 ||  || — || January 5, 2000 || Kitt Peak || Spacewatch || — || align=right | 4.1 km || 
|-id=830 bgcolor=#d6d6d6
| 269830 ||  || — || January 2, 2000 || Kitt Peak || Spacewatch || — || align=right | 3.8 km || 
|-id=831 bgcolor=#d6d6d6
| 269831 ||  || — || January 7, 2000 || Kitt Peak || Spacewatch || — || align=right | 2.3 km || 
|-id=832 bgcolor=#fefefe
| 269832 ||  || — || January 29, 2000 || Socorro || LINEAR || H || align=right data-sort-value="0.86" | 860 m || 
|-id=833 bgcolor=#fefefe
| 269833 ||  || — || January 28, 2000 || Kitt Peak || Spacewatch || — || align=right | 1.0 km || 
|-id=834 bgcolor=#fefefe
| 269834 ||  || — || January 29, 2000 || Kitt Peak || Spacewatch || NYS || align=right data-sort-value="0.69" | 690 m || 
|-id=835 bgcolor=#fefefe
| 269835 ||  || — || January 30, 2000 || Kitt Peak || Spacewatch || NYS || align=right data-sort-value="0.70" | 700 m || 
|-id=836 bgcolor=#d6d6d6
| 269836 ||  || — || January 30, 2000 || Socorro || LINEAR || — || align=right | 5.0 km || 
|-id=837 bgcolor=#fefefe
| 269837 ||  || — || January 26, 2000 || Kitt Peak || Spacewatch || FLO || align=right data-sort-value="0.77" | 770 m || 
|-id=838 bgcolor=#fefefe
| 269838 ||  || — || February 2, 2000 || Socorro || LINEAR || NYS || align=right data-sort-value="0.83" | 830 m || 
|-id=839 bgcolor=#d6d6d6
| 269839 ||  || — || February 2, 2000 || Socorro || LINEAR || — || align=right | 4.7 km || 
|-id=840 bgcolor=#fefefe
| 269840 ||  || — || February 2, 2000 || Socorro || LINEAR || KLI || align=right | 2.8 km || 
|-id=841 bgcolor=#d6d6d6
| 269841 ||  || — || February 2, 2000 || Socorro || LINEAR || — || align=right | 5.3 km || 
|-id=842 bgcolor=#fefefe
| 269842 ||  || — || February 1, 2000 || Kitt Peak || Spacewatch || — || align=right | 1.1 km || 
|-id=843 bgcolor=#d6d6d6
| 269843 ||  || — || February 3, 2000 || Socorro || LINEAR || EOS || align=right | 3.2 km || 
|-id=844 bgcolor=#fefefe
| 269844 ||  || — || February 3, 2000 || Kitt Peak || Spacewatch || — || align=right | 1.1 km || 
|-id=845 bgcolor=#d6d6d6
| 269845 ||  || — || February 6, 2000 || Kitt Peak || Spacewatch || — || align=right | 4.2 km || 
|-id=846 bgcolor=#fefefe
| 269846 ||  || — || February 26, 2000 || Kitt Peak || Spacewatch || EUT || align=right data-sort-value="0.56" | 560 m || 
|-id=847 bgcolor=#d6d6d6
| 269847 ||  || — || February 29, 2000 || Socorro || LINEAR || THB || align=right | 5.1 km || 
|-id=848 bgcolor=#d6d6d6
| 269848 ||  || — || February 29, 2000 || Socorro || LINEAR || — || align=right | 4.2 km || 
|-id=849 bgcolor=#fefefe
| 269849 ||  || — || February 29, 2000 || Socorro || LINEAR || NYS || align=right data-sort-value="0.88" | 880 m || 
|-id=850 bgcolor=#fefefe
| 269850 ||  || — || February 29, 2000 || Socorro || LINEAR || V || align=right data-sort-value="0.99" | 990 m || 
|-id=851 bgcolor=#fefefe
| 269851 ||  || — || February 29, 2000 || Socorro || LINEAR || NYS || align=right data-sort-value="0.88" | 880 m || 
|-id=852 bgcolor=#fefefe
| 269852 ||  || — || February 29, 2000 || Socorro || LINEAR || — || align=right data-sort-value="0.84" | 840 m || 
|-id=853 bgcolor=#fefefe
| 269853 ||  || — || February 29, 2000 || Socorro || LINEAR || — || align=right data-sort-value="0.92" | 920 m || 
|-id=854 bgcolor=#fefefe
| 269854 ||  || — || February 29, 2000 || Socorro || LINEAR || — || align=right | 1.2 km || 
|-id=855 bgcolor=#fefefe
| 269855 ||  || — || February 29, 2000 || Socorro || LINEAR || H || align=right data-sort-value="0.70" | 700 m || 
|-id=856 bgcolor=#d6d6d6
| 269856 ||  || — || February 29, 2000 || Socorro || LINEAR || — || align=right | 4.4 km || 
|-id=857 bgcolor=#d6d6d6
| 269857 ||  || — || February 27, 2000 || Kitt Peak || Spacewatch || — || align=right | 2.2 km || 
|-id=858 bgcolor=#fefefe
| 269858 ||  || — || March 4, 2000 || Tebbutt || F. B. Zoltowski || NYS || align=right data-sort-value="0.87" | 870 m || 
|-id=859 bgcolor=#fefefe
| 269859 ||  || — || March 2, 2000 || Kitt Peak || Spacewatch || MAS || align=right data-sort-value="0.70" | 700 m || 
|-id=860 bgcolor=#d6d6d6
| 269860 ||  || — || March 2, 2000 || Kitt Peak || Spacewatch || — || align=right | 4.3 km || 
|-id=861 bgcolor=#d6d6d6
| 269861 ||  || — || March 2, 2000 || Kitt Peak || Spacewatch || — || align=right | 3.8 km || 
|-id=862 bgcolor=#fefefe
| 269862 ||  || — || March 4, 2000 || Socorro || LINEAR || H || align=right data-sort-value="0.89" | 890 m || 
|-id=863 bgcolor=#d6d6d6
| 269863 ||  || — || March 3, 2000 || Kitt Peak || Spacewatch || EOS || align=right | 2.3 km || 
|-id=864 bgcolor=#d6d6d6
| 269864 ||  || — || March 3, 2000 || Kitt Peak || Spacewatch || — || align=right | 3.3 km || 
|-id=865 bgcolor=#fefefe
| 269865 ||  || — || March 3, 2000 || Kitt Peak || Spacewatch || MAS || align=right data-sort-value="0.71" | 710 m || 
|-id=866 bgcolor=#d6d6d6
| 269866 ||  || — || March 10, 2000 || Socorro || LINEAR || — || align=right | 2.5 km || 
|-id=867 bgcolor=#fefefe
| 269867 ||  || — || March 10, 2000 || Socorro || LINEAR || H || align=right data-sort-value="0.78" | 780 m || 
|-id=868 bgcolor=#d6d6d6
| 269868 ||  || — || March 9, 2000 || Socorro || LINEAR || — || align=right | 4.4 km || 
|-id=869 bgcolor=#d6d6d6
| 269869 ||  || — || March 11, 2000 || Anderson Mesa || LONEOS || — || align=right | 4.8 km || 
|-id=870 bgcolor=#d6d6d6
| 269870 ||  || — || March 5, 2000 || Socorro || LINEAR || — || align=right | 2.4 km || 
|-id=871 bgcolor=#d6d6d6
| 269871 ||  || — || February 11, 2000 || Kitt Peak || Spacewatch || — || align=right | 4.0 km || 
|-id=872 bgcolor=#fefefe
| 269872 ||  || — || March 3, 2000 || Socorro || LINEAR || NYS || align=right data-sort-value="0.73" | 730 m || 
|-id=873 bgcolor=#d6d6d6
| 269873 ||  || — || March 3, 2000 || Socorro || LINEAR || — || align=right | 3.5 km || 
|-id=874 bgcolor=#fefefe
| 269874 ||  || — || March 8, 2000 || Socorro || LINEAR || — || align=right | 1.4 km || 
|-id=875 bgcolor=#d6d6d6
| 269875 ||  || — || March 25, 2000 || Kitt Peak || Spacewatch || — || align=right | 4.5 km || 
|-id=876 bgcolor=#d6d6d6
| 269876 ||  || — || March 26, 2000 || Anderson Mesa || LONEOS || EUP || align=right | 5.5 km || 
|-id=877 bgcolor=#d6d6d6
| 269877 ||  || — || March 26, 2000 || Anderson Mesa || LONEOS || — || align=right | 6.2 km || 
|-id=878 bgcolor=#fefefe
| 269878 ||  || — || April 4, 2000 || Socorro || LINEAR || PHO || align=right | 1.4 km || 
|-id=879 bgcolor=#d6d6d6
| 269879 ||  || — || April 5, 2000 || Socorro || LINEAR || — || align=right | 6.1 km || 
|-id=880 bgcolor=#d6d6d6
| 269880 ||  || — || April 5, 2000 || Socorro || LINEAR || EOS || align=right | 3.1 km || 
|-id=881 bgcolor=#FA8072
| 269881 ||  || — || April 8, 2000 || Socorro || LINEAR || — || align=right | 1.4 km || 
|-id=882 bgcolor=#d6d6d6
| 269882 ||  || — || April 5, 2000 || Socorro || LINEAR || — || align=right | 4.7 km || 
|-id=883 bgcolor=#fefefe
| 269883 ||  || — || April 5, 2000 || Socorro || LINEAR || MAS || align=right data-sort-value="0.99" | 990 m || 
|-id=884 bgcolor=#fefefe
| 269884 ||  || — || April 5, 2000 || Socorro || LINEAR || ERI || align=right | 2.1 km || 
|-id=885 bgcolor=#fefefe
| 269885 ||  || — || April 5, 2000 || Socorro || LINEAR || MAS || align=right data-sort-value="0.88" | 880 m || 
|-id=886 bgcolor=#fefefe
| 269886 ||  || — || April 5, 2000 || Socorro || LINEAR || MAS || align=right data-sort-value="0.89" | 890 m || 
|-id=887 bgcolor=#d6d6d6
| 269887 ||  || — || April 5, 2000 || Socorro || LINEAR || HYG || align=right | 3.3 km || 
|-id=888 bgcolor=#fefefe
| 269888 ||  || — || April 5, 2000 || Socorro || LINEAR || ERI || align=right | 2.7 km || 
|-id=889 bgcolor=#fefefe
| 269889 ||  || — || April 5, 2000 || Socorro || LINEAR || NYS || align=right data-sort-value="0.93" | 930 m || 
|-id=890 bgcolor=#d6d6d6
| 269890 ||  || — || April 5, 2000 || Socorro || LINEAR || THM || align=right | 3.0 km || 
|-id=891 bgcolor=#d6d6d6
| 269891 ||  || — || April 5, 2000 || Socorro || LINEAR || URS || align=right | 5.7 km || 
|-id=892 bgcolor=#d6d6d6
| 269892 ||  || — || April 5, 2000 || Socorro || LINEAR || — || align=right | 5.2 km || 
|-id=893 bgcolor=#fefefe
| 269893 ||  || — || April 5, 2000 || Socorro || LINEAR || — || align=right | 1.1 km || 
|-id=894 bgcolor=#d6d6d6
| 269894 ||  || — || April 5, 2000 || Socorro || LINEAR || — || align=right | 4.6 km || 
|-id=895 bgcolor=#fefefe
| 269895 ||  || — || April 8, 2000 || Socorro || LINEAR || — || align=right | 1.1 km || 
|-id=896 bgcolor=#fefefe
| 269896 ||  || — || April 3, 2000 || Kitt Peak || Spacewatch || MAS || align=right data-sort-value="0.90" | 900 m || 
|-id=897 bgcolor=#d6d6d6
| 269897 ||  || — || April 3, 2000 || Kitt Peak || Spacewatch || — || align=right | 3.4 km || 
|-id=898 bgcolor=#fefefe
| 269898 ||  || — || April 5, 2000 || Kitt Peak || Spacewatch || V || align=right data-sort-value="0.84" | 840 m || 
|-id=899 bgcolor=#fefefe
| 269899 ||  || — || April 5, 2000 || Kitt Peak || Spacewatch || MAS || align=right data-sort-value="0.78" | 780 m || 
|-id=900 bgcolor=#fefefe
| 269900 ||  || — || April 7, 2000 || Kitt Peak || Spacewatch || NYS || align=right data-sort-value="0.79" | 790 m || 
|}

269901–270000 

|-bgcolor=#d6d6d6
| 269901 ||  || — || April 24, 2000 || Kitt Peak || Spacewatch || — || align=right | 4.3 km || 
|-id=902 bgcolor=#FA8072
| 269902 ||  || — || April 26, 2000 || Kitt Peak || Spacewatch || — || align=right data-sort-value="0.95" | 950 m || 
|-id=903 bgcolor=#d6d6d6
| 269903 ||  || — || April 29, 2000 || Socorro || LINEAR || EUP || align=right | 4.5 km || 
|-id=904 bgcolor=#fefefe
| 269904 ||  || — || April 24, 2000 || Kitt Peak || Spacewatch || NYS || align=right data-sort-value="0.80" | 800 m || 
|-id=905 bgcolor=#fefefe
| 269905 ||  || — || April 24, 2000 || Kitt Peak || Spacewatch || MAS || align=right data-sort-value="0.75" | 750 m || 
|-id=906 bgcolor=#d6d6d6
| 269906 ||  || — || April 25, 2000 || Kitt Peak || Spacewatch || EOS || align=right | 2.8 km || 
|-id=907 bgcolor=#fefefe
| 269907 ||  || — || April 25, 2000 || Kitt Peak || Spacewatch || NYS || align=right data-sort-value="0.84" | 840 m || 
|-id=908 bgcolor=#d6d6d6
| 269908 ||  || — || April 27, 2000 || Socorro || LINEAR || — || align=right | 5.5 km || 
|-id=909 bgcolor=#d6d6d6
| 269909 ||  || — || April 30, 2000 || Kitt Peak || Spacewatch || — || align=right | 3.5 km || 
|-id=910 bgcolor=#d6d6d6
| 269910 ||  || — || April 30, 2000 || Kitt Peak || Spacewatch || — || align=right | 4.9 km || 
|-id=911 bgcolor=#d6d6d6
| 269911 ||  || — || April 29, 2000 || Socorro || LINEAR || — || align=right | 6.2 km || 
|-id=912 bgcolor=#d6d6d6
| 269912 ||  || — || April 28, 2000 || Socorro || LINEAR || — || align=right | 5.4 km || 
|-id=913 bgcolor=#d6d6d6
| 269913 ||  || — || April 28, 2000 || Anderson Mesa || LONEOS || — || align=right | 5.3 km || 
|-id=914 bgcolor=#fefefe
| 269914 ||  || — || May 7, 2000 || Prescott || P. G. Comba || NYS || align=right data-sort-value="0.88" | 880 m || 
|-id=915 bgcolor=#fefefe
| 269915 ||  || — || May 7, 2000 || Socorro || LINEAR || MAS || align=right | 1.0 km || 
|-id=916 bgcolor=#fefefe
| 269916 ||  || — || May 7, 2000 || Socorro || LINEAR || — || align=right | 1.4 km || 
|-id=917 bgcolor=#fefefe
| 269917 ||  || — || May 9, 2000 || Socorro || LINEAR || — || align=right | 1.4 km || 
|-id=918 bgcolor=#fefefe
| 269918 ||  || — || May 4, 2000 || Anderson Mesa || LONEOS || — || align=right | 1.6 km || 
|-id=919 bgcolor=#d6d6d6
| 269919 ||  || — || May 5, 2000 || Kitt Peak || Spacewatch || — || align=right | 4.0 km || 
|-id=920 bgcolor=#d6d6d6
| 269920 ||  || — || May 28, 2000 || Socorro || LINEAR || LIX || align=right | 5.2 km || 
|-id=921 bgcolor=#d6d6d6
| 269921 ||  || — || May 24, 2000 || Kitt Peak || Spacewatch || THM || align=right | 2.4 km || 
|-id=922 bgcolor=#fefefe
| 269922 ||  || — || May 28, 2000 || Kitt Peak || Spacewatch || — || align=right | 1.3 km || 
|-id=923 bgcolor=#fefefe
| 269923 ||  || — || May 27, 2000 || Socorro || LINEAR || ERI || align=right | 1.9 km || 
|-id=924 bgcolor=#d6d6d6
| 269924 ||  || — || June 5, 2000 || Kitt Peak || Spacewatch || VER || align=right | 3.7 km || 
|-id=925 bgcolor=#fefefe
| 269925 ||  || — || July 5, 2000 || Anderson Mesa || LONEOS || — || align=right | 1.3 km || 
|-id=926 bgcolor=#fefefe
| 269926 ||  || — || July 2, 2000 || Kitt Peak || Spacewatch || — || align=right | 1.0 km || 
|-id=927 bgcolor=#FA8072
| 269927 ||  || — || July 31, 2000 || Socorro || LINEAR || — || align=right | 1.7 km || 
|-id=928 bgcolor=#E9E9E9
| 269928 ||  || — || July 29, 2000 || Anderson Mesa || LONEOS || — || align=right | 1.8 km || 
|-id=929 bgcolor=#E9E9E9
| 269929 ||  || — || August 24, 2000 || Socorro || LINEAR || — || align=right | 1.1 km || 
|-id=930 bgcolor=#E9E9E9
| 269930 ||  || — || August 31, 2000 || Socorro || LINEAR || — || align=right | 1.4 km || 
|-id=931 bgcolor=#E9E9E9
| 269931 ||  || — || August 31, 2000 || Socorro || LINEAR || — || align=right | 1.7 km || 
|-id=932 bgcolor=#E9E9E9
| 269932 ||  || — || August 31, 2000 || Socorro || LINEAR || — || align=right | 1.5 km || 
|-id=933 bgcolor=#E9E9E9
| 269933 ||  || — || August 31, 2000 || Socorro || LINEAR || — || align=right | 2.2 km || 
|-id=934 bgcolor=#E9E9E9
| 269934 ||  || — || August 31, 2000 || Socorro || LINEAR || VIB || align=right | 2.1 km || 
|-id=935 bgcolor=#E9E9E9
| 269935 ||  || — || August 28, 2000 || Cerro Tololo || M. W. Buie || — || align=right data-sort-value="0.93" | 930 m || 
|-id=936 bgcolor=#E9E9E9
| 269936 ||  || — || September 1, 2000 || Socorro || LINEAR || — || align=right | 3.4 km || 
|-id=937 bgcolor=#E9E9E9
| 269937 ||  || — || September 3, 2000 || Socorro || LINEAR || — || align=right | 2.0 km || 
|-id=938 bgcolor=#E9E9E9
| 269938 ||  || — || September 1, 2000 || Socorro || LINEAR || AER || align=right | 2.0 km || 
|-id=939 bgcolor=#E9E9E9
| 269939 ||  || — || September 1, 2000 || Socorro || LINEAR || — || align=right | 2.8 km || 
|-id=940 bgcolor=#E9E9E9
| 269940 ||  || — || September 1, 2000 || Socorro || LINEAR || AER || align=right | 2.0 km || 
|-id=941 bgcolor=#E9E9E9
| 269941 ||  || — || September 5, 2000 || Anderson Mesa || LONEOS || — || align=right | 1.8 km || 
|-id=942 bgcolor=#E9E9E9
| 269942 ||  || — || September 5, 2000 || Anderson Mesa || LONEOS || EUN || align=right | 2.3 km || 
|-id=943 bgcolor=#fefefe
| 269943 ||  || — || September 24, 2000 || Prescott || P. G. Comba || — || align=right data-sort-value="0.69" | 690 m || 
|-id=944 bgcolor=#E9E9E9
| 269944 ||  || — || September 23, 2000 || Socorro || LINEAR || — || align=right | 3.3 km || 
|-id=945 bgcolor=#E9E9E9
| 269945 ||  || — || September 23, 2000 || Socorro || LINEAR || EUN || align=right | 2.1 km || 
|-id=946 bgcolor=#E9E9E9
| 269946 ||  || — || September 24, 2000 || Socorro || LINEAR || EUN || align=right | 1.6 km || 
|-id=947 bgcolor=#E9E9E9
| 269947 ||  || — || September 24, 2000 || Socorro || LINEAR || — || align=right | 1.1 km || 
|-id=948 bgcolor=#E9E9E9
| 269948 ||  || — || September 24, 2000 || Socorro || LINEAR || — || align=right | 1.3 km || 
|-id=949 bgcolor=#E9E9E9
| 269949 ||  || — || September 24, 2000 || Socorro || LINEAR || RAF || align=right | 1.4 km || 
|-id=950 bgcolor=#E9E9E9
| 269950 ||  || — || September 23, 2000 || Socorro || LINEAR || — || align=right | 2.3 km || 
|-id=951 bgcolor=#E9E9E9
| 269951 ||  || — || September 24, 2000 || Socorro || LINEAR || — || align=right | 1.6 km || 
|-id=952 bgcolor=#E9E9E9
| 269952 ||  || — || September 24, 2000 || Socorro || LINEAR || — || align=right | 1.4 km || 
|-id=953 bgcolor=#E9E9E9
| 269953 ||  || — || September 30, 2000 || Ondřejov || P. Kušnirák, P. Pravec || — || align=right | 1.2 km || 
|-id=954 bgcolor=#E9E9E9
| 269954 ||  || — || September 24, 2000 || Socorro || LINEAR || — || align=right | 1.5 km || 
|-id=955 bgcolor=#E9E9E9
| 269955 ||  || — || September 26, 2000 || Socorro || LINEAR || JUN || align=right | 1.6 km || 
|-id=956 bgcolor=#E9E9E9
| 269956 ||  || — || September 24, 2000 || Socorro || LINEAR || — || align=right | 4.1 km || 
|-id=957 bgcolor=#E9E9E9
| 269957 ||  || — || September 27, 2000 || Socorro || LINEAR || BAR || align=right | 1.4 km || 
|-id=958 bgcolor=#E9E9E9
| 269958 ||  || — || September 30, 2000 || Socorro || LINEAR || BAR || align=right | 2.2 km || 
|-id=959 bgcolor=#E9E9E9
| 269959 ||  || — || September 23, 2000 || Socorro || LINEAR || — || align=right | 1.8 km || 
|-id=960 bgcolor=#E9E9E9
| 269960 ||  || — || September 24, 2000 || Socorro || LINEAR || KON || align=right | 3.6 km || 
|-id=961 bgcolor=#E9E9E9
| 269961 ||  || — || September 24, 2000 || Socorro || LINEAR || RAF || align=right | 1.1 km || 
|-id=962 bgcolor=#E9E9E9
| 269962 ||  || — || September 24, 2000 || Socorro || LINEAR || — || align=right | 1.7 km || 
|-id=963 bgcolor=#E9E9E9
| 269963 ||  || — || September 24, 2000 || Socorro || LINEAR || — || align=right | 2.4 km || 
|-id=964 bgcolor=#fefefe
| 269964 ||  || — || September 27, 2000 || Socorro || LINEAR || — || align=right data-sort-value="0.75" | 750 m || 
|-id=965 bgcolor=#E9E9E9
| 269965 ||  || — || September 27, 2000 || Socorro || LINEAR || — || align=right | 2.2 km || 
|-id=966 bgcolor=#E9E9E9
| 269966 ||  || — || September 28, 2000 || Socorro || LINEAR || — || align=right | 1.7 km || 
|-id=967 bgcolor=#E9E9E9
| 269967 ||  || — || September 30, 2000 || Socorro || LINEAR || — || align=right | 2.7 km || 
|-id=968 bgcolor=#E9E9E9
| 269968 ||  || — || September 26, 2000 || Haleakala || NEAT || — || align=right | 1.2 km || 
|-id=969 bgcolor=#E9E9E9
| 269969 ||  || — || September 24, 2000 || Socorro || LINEAR || — || align=right | 2.6 km || 
|-id=970 bgcolor=#E9E9E9
| 269970 ||  || — || September 26, 2000 || Anderson Mesa || LONEOS || — || align=right | 1.3 km || 
|-id=971 bgcolor=#E9E9E9
| 269971 ||  || — || October 1, 2000 || Socorro || LINEAR || MIS || align=right | 2.2 km || 
|-id=972 bgcolor=#E9E9E9
| 269972 ||  || — || October 1, 2000 || Socorro || LINEAR || — || align=right | 1.9 km || 
|-id=973 bgcolor=#E9E9E9
| 269973 ||  || — || October 1, 2000 || Socorro || LINEAR || — || align=right | 2.5 km || 
|-id=974 bgcolor=#E9E9E9
| 269974 ||  || — || October 1, 2000 || Socorro || LINEAR || — || align=right | 2.6 km || 
|-id=975 bgcolor=#E9E9E9
| 269975 ||  || — || October 1, 2000 || Socorro || LINEAR || — || align=right | 2.1 km || 
|-id=976 bgcolor=#E9E9E9
| 269976 ||  || — || October 1, 2000 || Socorro || LINEAR || XIZ || align=right | 1.5 km || 
|-id=977 bgcolor=#E9E9E9
| 269977 ||  || — || October 3, 2000 || Socorro || LINEAR || — || align=right | 2.0 km || 
|-id=978 bgcolor=#E9E9E9
| 269978 ||  || — || October 1, 2000 || Socorro || LINEAR || — || align=right | 2.3 km || 
|-id=979 bgcolor=#E9E9E9
| 269979 ||  || — || October 1, 2000 || Socorro || LINEAR || — || align=right | 1.2 km || 
|-id=980 bgcolor=#E9E9E9
| 269980 ||  || — || October 1, 2000 || Socorro || LINEAR || — || align=right | 1.9 km || 
|-id=981 bgcolor=#E9E9E9
| 269981 ||  || — || October 2, 2000 || Anderson Mesa || LONEOS || — || align=right | 1.9 km || 
|-id=982 bgcolor=#E9E9E9
| 269982 ||  || — || October 3, 2000 || Socorro || LINEAR || — || align=right | 1.2 km || 
|-id=983 bgcolor=#E9E9E9
| 269983 ||  || — || October 24, 2000 || Socorro || LINEAR || GER || align=right | 2.8 km || 
|-id=984 bgcolor=#fefefe
| 269984 ||  || — || October 24, 2000 || Socorro || LINEAR || H || align=right data-sort-value="0.83" | 830 m || 
|-id=985 bgcolor=#E9E9E9
| 269985 ||  || — || October 24, 2000 || Socorro || LINEAR || — || align=right | 1.9 km || 
|-id=986 bgcolor=#E9E9E9
| 269986 ||  || — || October 25, 2000 || Socorro || LINEAR || — || align=right | 2.1 km || 
|-id=987 bgcolor=#E9E9E9
| 269987 ||  || — || October 25, 2000 || Socorro || LINEAR || — || align=right | 2.3 km || 
|-id=988 bgcolor=#E9E9E9
| 269988 ||  || — || October 31, 2000 || Socorro || LINEAR || — || align=right | 2.0 km || 
|-id=989 bgcolor=#E9E9E9
| 269989 ||  || — || October 25, 2000 || Socorro || LINEAR || — || align=right | 2.2 km || 
|-id=990 bgcolor=#E9E9E9
| 269990 ||  || — || November 2, 2000 || Oaxaca || J. M. Roe || — || align=right | 2.4 km || 
|-id=991 bgcolor=#E9E9E9
| 269991 ||  || — || November 1, 2000 || Socorro || LINEAR || EUN || align=right | 2.1 km || 
|-id=992 bgcolor=#E9E9E9
| 269992 ||  || — || November 3, 2000 || Socorro || LINEAR || — || align=right | 2.8 km || 
|-id=993 bgcolor=#FA8072
| 269993 ||  || — || November 27, 2000 || Socorro || LINEAR || — || align=right data-sort-value="0.90" | 900 m || 
|-id=994 bgcolor=#d6d6d6
| 269994 ||  || — || November 19, 2000 || Socorro || LINEAR || — || align=right | 4.5 km || 
|-id=995 bgcolor=#E9E9E9
| 269995 ||  || — || November 20, 2000 || Socorro || LINEAR || — || align=right | 2.7 km || 
|-id=996 bgcolor=#E9E9E9
| 269996 ||  || — || November 19, 2000 || Kitt Peak || Spacewatch || — || align=right | 1.5 km || 
|-id=997 bgcolor=#E9E9E9
| 269997 ||  || — || December 4, 2000 || Socorro || LINEAR || — || align=right | 2.4 km || 
|-id=998 bgcolor=#E9E9E9
| 269998 ||  || — || December 5, 2000 || Socorro || LINEAR || — || align=right | 3.8 km || 
|-id=999 bgcolor=#E9E9E9
| 269999 ||  || — || December 20, 2000 || Socorro || LINEAR || — || align=right | 4.0 km || 
|-id=000 bgcolor=#E9E9E9
| 270000 ||  || — || December 28, 2000 || Fair Oaks Ranch || J. V. McClusky || — || align=right | 2.9 km || 
|}

References

External links 
 Discovery Circumstances: Numbered Minor Planets (265001)–(270000) (IAU Minor Planet Center)

0269